= Battle of Cynoscephalae (364 BC) =

Battle between Pelopidas of Thebes and Alexander of Pherae

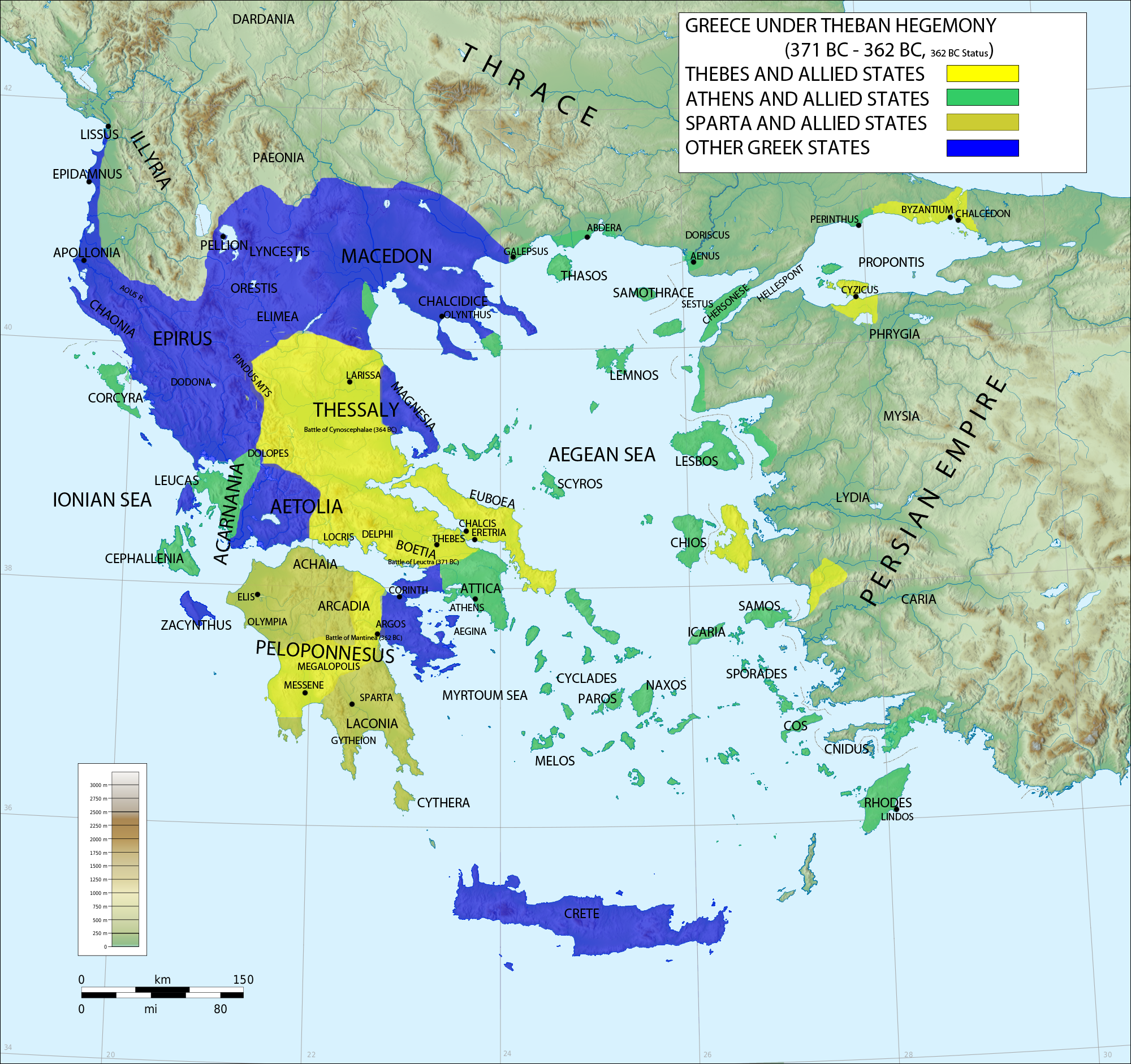
- Greece in 362 BC, showing the area under Theban hegemony and the location of Cynoscephalae
Date	364 BC
Location	Cynoscephalae 39.36°N 22.70°E
Result	Theban and Thessalian victory

Belligerents
Thebes; Thessalians	Pherae

Commanders and leaders
Pelopidas †	Alexander of Pherae

Strength
8,500–10,000 (estimated)	17,000–20,000 (estimated)

Casualties and losses
Unknown	3,000 (according to Plutarch)

The Battle of Cynoscephalae was a military engagement in 364 BC between the forces of Thebes and its Thessalian allies, led by Pelopidas, against the army of Alexander of Pherae. Pelopidas's army defeated Alexander's much larger force, ending Alexander's attempts to secure hegemony in Thessaly, though Pelopidas himself was killed.

Alexander had extended the dominance of Pherae over the other cities of Thessaly since his assumption of power in 369 BC, leading the Thessalians to request military support from Thebes, then the dominant military power in Greece. After inconclusive interventions in 369 and 368, the Thebans voted to send a force of 7,000 under Pelopidas in 364, but the army was disbanded following a solar eclipse on 13 July, considered a bad omen. Pelopidas set out for Thessaly with a small force of volunteer cavalry, and recruited further untrained troops from the Thessalians. The final compositions of the opposing forces are unclear: Alexander is believed to have outnumbered Pelopidas by a factor of around two to one, and to have commanded around 17,000–20,000 troops.

The armies met at Cynoscephalae, a hilly region to the west of Pherae. In the initial phases of the battle, both attempted to use light infantry to seize the high ground between them: Alexander's forces ultimately succeeded, while Pelopidas's cavalry won control of the low-lying plain to the south. Pelopidas then recalled his cavalry, dismounted, and reorganised his infantry: Alexander's forces withdrew from the high ground to avoid being flanked, and subsequently broke under an allied attack in which Pelopidas was killed. In the aftermath of the battle, the Thessalians gave several honours to Pelopidas and his children, and Alexander was forced to give up his gains in Thessaly and to accept a position as a subordinate ally of the Thebans.

== Background ==
The tyrant Alexander took power in the Thessalian city of Pherae in 369 BCE, after murdering his uncle Polyphron, who had himself been tyrant of Pherae and tagos (chief magistrate) of the Thessalian League, a confederacy of the region's city-states. Alexander himself soon after became tagos of the league, and extended the dominance of Pherae over the other Thessalian cities. The Aleuadae, the leading family of the city of Larissa, appealed to Alexander II of Macedon for support: Alexander led a Macedonian invasion against Pherae in 369, which took control of the cities of Larissa and Cranon and left garrisons in them. Alexander was forced to return to Macedon to oppose Ptolemy of Aloros, who was leading an (ultimately successful) attempt to take his throne, and the Thessalians – possibly the leaders of the city of Pharsalos – appealed to Thebes, then the dominant military power in Greece, to continue the struggle against Alexander of Pherae.

The Thebans sent the general Pelopidas to investigate in 369; he entered talks with Alexander of Pherae and took control of the cities of Larissa and the other cities held by the Macedonians. These talks broke down after Alexander refused Pelopidas's stipulation that he accept a constitutional basis for his power, probably by taking the office of archon rather than that of tagos, which had no constitutional foundation and was unpopular with the Thessalians. Pelopidas also made an alliance with Alexander II against Ptolemy, but did not have the troops to actively intervene in Macedon.

The following year (368), the Thessalians again appealed to Thebes against Alexander of Pherae: the Athenians, Thebes's major rival, also sent troops and ships to support Ptolemy against Pausanias, a third claimant to the Macedonian throne. The Thebans sent an embassy without an army, consisting of Pelopidas and Ismenias: Pelopidas began recruiting mercenaries once he reached Thessaly, and invaded Macedon, but his troops deserted there. The army of Alexander of Pherae met the Thebans on their return to Thessaly, taking Pelopidas and Ismenias prisoner, and capturing Pharsalos: the Thebans sent an unsuccessful military force of 8,000 hoplites and 600 cavalry to free them, followed by another, under Epaminondas, which secured the release of the prisoners and a thirty-day truce.

=== Prelude ===
In 364, Alexander of Pherae's opponents in Thessaly again persuaded the Thebans to intervene against him, following his capture of the regions of Achaia Phthiotis and Magnesia. Thebes's intervention was also motivated by the actions of Timotheos of Heraclea, whose expanding power in the Chalkidiki peninsula threatened Thebes's Macedonian allies and therefore its influence in the north of Greece. The Theban assembly voted to give Pelopidas an army of seven thousand troops, probably consisting of 5,000 hoplites, 1,500 lightly armed skirmishers (psiloi), and 500 cavalry. However, a solar eclipse occurred on 13 July, which was interpreted as a bad omen, and the army was disbanded.

Pelopidas set forth regardless, against the advice of Thebes's priests and to the general disapproval of its people, with a force of cavalry volunteers and mercenaries. He gathered allies in Thessaly, assembling what the classicist James Romm calls "a rough, untrained phalanx", in addition to around three hundred Theban cavalry and other cavalry from Thessaly. They assembled in Pharsalos, and then advanced to meet Alexander's forces, moving north across the Enipeas river then eastward along its valley. Meanwhile, Alexander was moving through the Cynoscephalae Hills towards Pharsalos from the east. His forces, which included professional spearmen, advanced to the Thetideion, a temple of the goddess Thetis on a ridge approximately 204 m (669 ft) in height, north of the Enipeas valley and to the west of Pherae. According to the account of Diodorus Siculus, who wrote in the first century BCE, Alexander had around 20,000 troops; Plutarch, who wrote between the first and second centuries CE, claims that Alexander's infantry outnumbered Pelopidas's by a factor of two to one. The historian Fred Eugene Ray Jr, citing an estimate of Thessaly's total ability to produce cavalry made by Xenophon in the fourth century BCE, suggests that Alexander could have had 4,000 cavalry and a total of 17,000 troops; Romm estimates that his overall force was twice the size of Pelopidas's.

== Battle ==
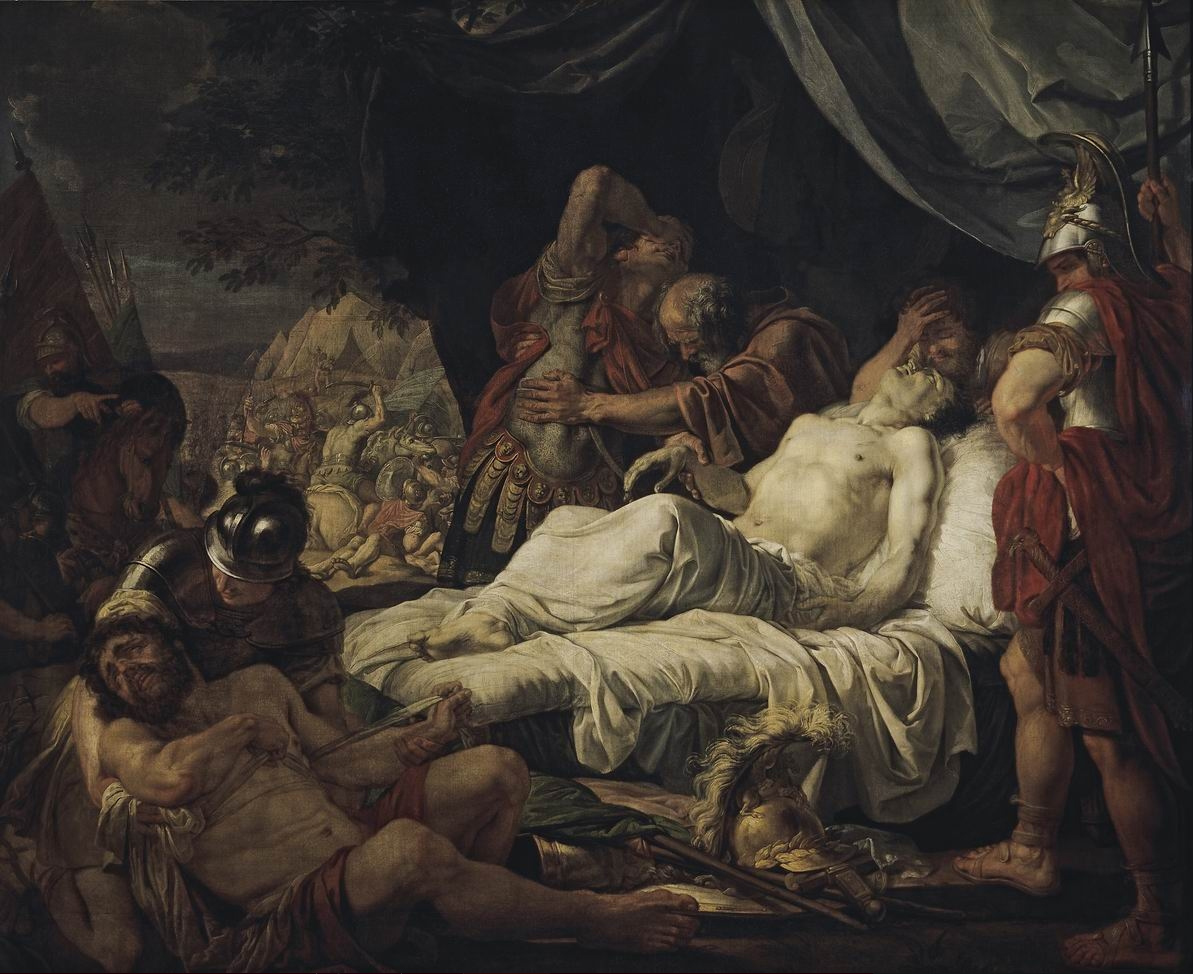
Death of Pelopidas, by Andrey Ivanov, 1805–1806

Pelopidas was informed of Alexander's positions by scouts, and decided upon an immediate engagement. In the opening stages of the battle, both sides immediately sent light infantry (peltasts) to contest the high ground between them: in Pelopidas's army, these were Thessalians. Alexander's forces arrived first, and generally outmatched Pelopidas's, probably because of their greater experience. Meanwhile, the two sides' cavalry fought for the low-lying plain to the south, with Pelopidas in command of the allied contingent. The Thebans and Thessalians won the cavalry duel, while Alexander's forces dislodged them from the high ground: an effort to reclaim it by sending in more heavily armed hoplites ended in failure and heavy losses. Pelopidas accordingly called back the cavalry, rode to the rear of his infantry, and re-equipped himself as a hoplite. He reorganised his forces with the Thessalians in a deep formation on the left and the Thebans on the right: these made several unsuccessful attacks before Alexander's forces withdrew to prevent a flanking manoeuvre by Pelopidas's cavalry, reforming behind their skirmishers on the plain. Roel Konijnendijk draws attention to the unusual nature of the Theban reorganisations, credited by Plutarch to Pelopidas's inspirational leadership and his troops' hatred of Alexander: in nearly all other cases, fleeing hoplites were unable to recover themselves, though Konijnendijk writes that it is unclear how or how far Pelopidas would have been able to orchestrate this rally.

Pelopidas led an attack towards Alexander's right wing, where he could see Alexander himself: the attack became disorganised as the Thebans and Thessalians charged downhill, leaving Pelopidas exposed in front of his forces, where he was killed by javelins. The allied hoplites succeeded in reorganising and, with the assistance of their cavalry, breaking Alexander's army: according to Plutarch, 3,000 of his troops were killed, partly in the ensuing pursuit.

== Aftermath ==
According to Plutarch, the Thessalians honoured Pelopidas by piling captured enemy weapons around his body: magistrates from nearby towns subsequently brought treasures to be buried with him. Thessalian cities also granted lands to his children and raised a bronze statue in his memory, sculpted by Lysippos. In the negotiations which followed, possibly after a second battle, Alexander was forced to relinquish the cities he had taken and accept an alliance with Thebes. Thebes assumed control of Magnesia and Achaea Phthiotis, and Alexander agreed, according to Diodorus, "for the future to be the ruler over Pherae alone". (Note: Sprawski 2006, p. 144, citing Diodorus Siculus, 15.80.6.) This established Thebes as hegemon over Thessaly, and Alexander was required to send troops to support its military campaigns. He was assassinated in 358 or 357 BCE by his wife Thebe and her brothers.

== Bibliography ==
- Buckler, John (1980). The Theban Hegemony, 371–362 BCE. Cambridge, MA: Harvard University Press. ISBN 0-674-87645-8 – via Internet Archive.
- Buckley, Terry (1996). Aspects of Greek History, 750–323 BC: A Source-based Approach. Abingdon: Routledge. ISBN 978-0-415-54977-6 – via Internet Archive.
- Konijnendijk, Roel (2018). Classical Greek Tactics: A Cultural History. Leiden: Brill. ISBN 978-90-04-35557-6.
- Ray, Fred Eugene, Jr. (2012). Greek and Macedonian Land Battles of the 4th Century B.C.: A History and Analysis of 187 Engagements. Jefferson: McFarland & Company, Inc. ISBN 978-0-7864-6973-4.
- Romm, James (2021). The Sacred Band: Three Hundred Theban Lovers and the Last Days of Greek Freedom. New York: Scribner.
- Roy, Jim (1994). "Thebes in the 360s BC". In Lewis, J. M.; Boardman, John; Hornblower, Simon; Ostwald, M. (eds.). The Cambridge Ancient History. Vol. 6: The Fourth Century BC (2nd ed.). Cambridge University Press. doi:10.1017/CHOL9780521233484. ISBN 978-1-139-05433-1.
- Sprawski, Sławomir (2006). "Alexander of Pherae: Infelix Tyrant". In Lewis, Sian (ed.). Ancient Tyranny. Edinburgh University Press. pp. 135–150. ISBN 0-7486-2125-3.
