= 364 BC =

364 BC in various calendars
- Gregorian calendar: 364 BC; CCCLXIV BC
- Ab urbe condita: 390
- Ancient Egypt era: XXX dynasty, 17
- Pharaoh: Nectanebo I, 17
- Ancient Greek Olympiad (summer): 104th Olympiad (victor)¹
- Assyrian calendar: 4387
- Balinese saka calendar: N/A
- Bengali calendar: −957 – −956
- Berber calendar: 587
- Buddhist calendar: 181
- Burmese calendar: −1001
- Byzantine calendar: 5145–5146
- Chinese calendar: 丙辰年 (Fire Dragon); 2334 or 2127 — to — 丁巳年 (Fire Snake); 2335 or 2128
- Coptic calendar: −647 – −646
- Discordian calendar: 803
- Ethiopian calendar: −371 – −370
- Hebrew calendar: 3397–3398
- Hindu calendars
- Vikram Samvat: −307 – −306
- Shaka Samvat: N/A
- Kali Yuga: 2737–2738
- Holocene calendar: 9637
- Iranian calendar: 985 BP – 984 BP
- Islamic calendar: 1015 BH – 1014 BH
- Javanese calendar: N/A
- Julian calendar: N/A
- Korean calendar: 1970
- Minguo calendar: 2275 before ROC 民前2275年
- Nanakshahi calendar: −1831
- Thai solar calendar: 179–180
- Tibetan calendar: མེ་ཕོ་འབྲུག་ལོ་ (male Fire-Dragon) −237 or −618 or −1390 — to — མེ་མོ་སྦྲུལ་ལོ་ (female Fire-Snake) −236 or −617 or −1389

Year 364 BC was a year of the pre-Julian Roman calendar. At the time, it was known as the Year of the Consulship of Peticus and Calvus (or, less frequently, year 390 Ab urbe condita). The denomination 364 BC for this year has been used since the early medieval period, when the Anno Domini calendar era became the prevalent method in Europe for naming years.

== Events ==
=== By place ===
==== Greece ====
- On the advice of the city's military leader, Epaminondas, Thebes builds a fleet of 100 triremes to help combat Athens. Thebes destroys its Boeotian rival Orchomenus.
- Philip II of Macedon, brother of the reigning king of Macedonia, returns to his native land after having been held as a hostage in Thebes since 369 BC.
- The army of Thebes under their statesman and general, Pelopidas, defeats Alexander of Pherae in the Battle of Cynoscephalae in Thessaly, but Pelopidas is killed during the battle. As a result of his loss of this battle, Alexander is compelled by Thebes to acknowledge the freedom of the Thessalian cities, to limit his rule to Pherae, and to join the Boeotian League.
- The Spartans under Archidamus III are defeated by the Arcadians at Cromnus.
- The Athenian general, Iphicrates, fails in attempts to recover Amphipolis. Retiring to Thrace, Iphicrates fights for his father-in-law, the Thracian king Cotys I, against Athens for the possession of the Thracian Chersonese. Cotys I is victorious and controls the whole Chersonese peninsula by 359 BC.
- Timophanes, along with a number of colleagues, including his brother Timoleon, takes possession of the acropolis of Corinth and Timophanes makes himself master of the city. Later, Timoleon, after ineffectual protests, tacitly acquiesces to his colleagues putting Timophanes to death for his actions.

==== China ====
- The Chinese astronomer Gan De from the State of Qi reportedly discovers the moon Ganymede, belonging to Jupiter, and makes the earliest known sunspot observations.

== Deaths ==
- Pelopidas, Theban statesman (killed in the Battle of Cynoscephalae in Thessaly)
