= Polyphron of Pherae =

Tyrant of Thessalian Pherae and Tagus from 370 BC to 369 BC

Polyphron (Ancient Greek: Πολύφρων) was a tyrant of Pherae and Tagus of the Thessalian League (370-369 BC).

In 370 BC, Polyphron succeeded Jason of Pherae together with his brother Polydorus, and the brothers shared the power as co-tyrants. However this dual tyranny did not last long, as Polyphron murdered his brother the same year, effectively becoming the sole ruler.

Polyphron turned out to be a cruel tyrant, he put to death few of the best citizens of Pharsalus, among them Polydamas, and exiled many more from Larissa.

In 369 BC he was murdered by Alexander of Pherae, who became a tyrant himself.
