= Ancient Thessaly =

Traditional region of Ancient Greece

Thessalia Θεσσαλία
- Region
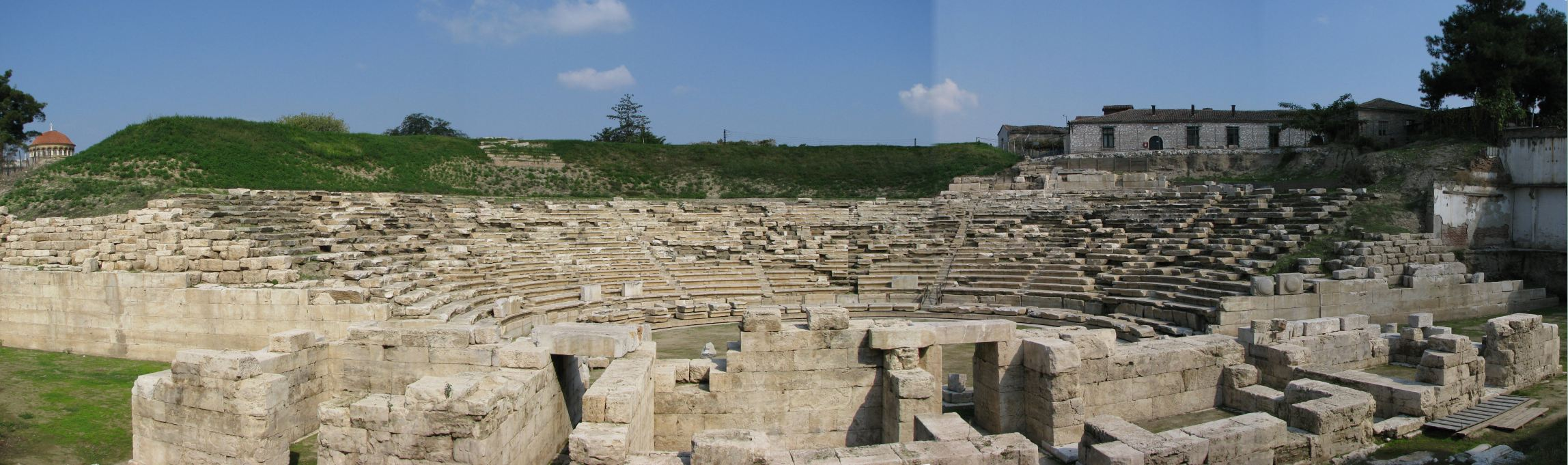
- Ancient theatre in Larissa

- Map of ancient Thessaly
- Location: Thessaly
- Major cities: Larissa, Pherae
- Dialects: Aeolic
- Key periods: Pheraean Ascendancy

Thessaly or Thessalia (Attic Greek: Θεσσαλία, Thessalía or Θετταλία, Thettalía) was one of the traditional regions of Ancient Greece. During the Mycenaean period, Thessaly was known as Aeolia, a name that continued to be used for one of the major tribes of Greece, the Aeolians, and their dialect of Greek, Aeolic.

== Geography ==
At its greatest extent, ancient Thessaly was a wide area stretching from Mount Olympus to the north to the Spercheios Valley to the south. Thessaly is a geographically diverse region, consisting of broad central plains surrounded by mountains. The plains are bounded by the Pindos Mountains to the west, Mount Othrys to the south, the Pelion and Ossa ranges to the east, and Mount Olympus to the North. The central plains consist of two basins, the Larisa basin and the Karditsa basin, drained by the Pineios River into the Vale of Tempe. The Pagasetic Gulf in southeastern Thessaly was and is the only body of water suitable for harbours in the region.

Strictly speaking, Thessaly refers primarily to the central plains inhabited by the Thessalians in antiquity. The plains were divided into four administrative regions called tetrads: Pelasgiotis, Phthiotis, Thessaliotis, and Histiaeotis. In its broader sense, Thessaly also included the surrounding regions called the perioikoi, which were regions inhabited by different ethnic groups that were closely tied to the Thessalians either as subordinates, dependents, or allies. The perioikoi were composed of Perrhaibia, Magnesia, Achaea Phthiotis, Dolopia, Ainis, Malis, and Oitaia. The three largest cities in Thessaly were Larisa (Pelasgiotis), Pherai (Pelasgiotis), and Pharsalos (Phthiotis).

The Thessalian plains were ideally suited for cultivating grains and cereals, and were known in antiquity for horse-rearing. Alexander the Great's horse, Bucephalus, was originally from Pharsalos. The surrounding mountainous regions, however, were less suitable for agriculture and relied more heavily on pastoralism.

== History ==
Thessaly was home to extensive Neolithic and Chalcolithic cultures around 6000 BC–2500 BC (see Cardium pottery, Dimini and Sesklo). Mycenaean settlements have also been discovered in Thessaly unearthing, at the Kastron of Palaia Hill, in Volos, tablets bearing Mycenaean Greek inscriptions, written in Linear B.

In mythology, Thessaly was homeland of the heroes Achilles and Jason, as well of mythological creatures and peoples, Centaurs, Lapiths, Phlegyans and Myrmidons. Ancient tribes in Thessaly mentioned by Homer or other poets were: Aeolians, Magnetes, Perrhaebi and Pelasgians.

The name of Thessaly recorded epigraphically in Aeolic variants *Πετταλία, Πετθαλία, Φετταλία, Θετταλία.

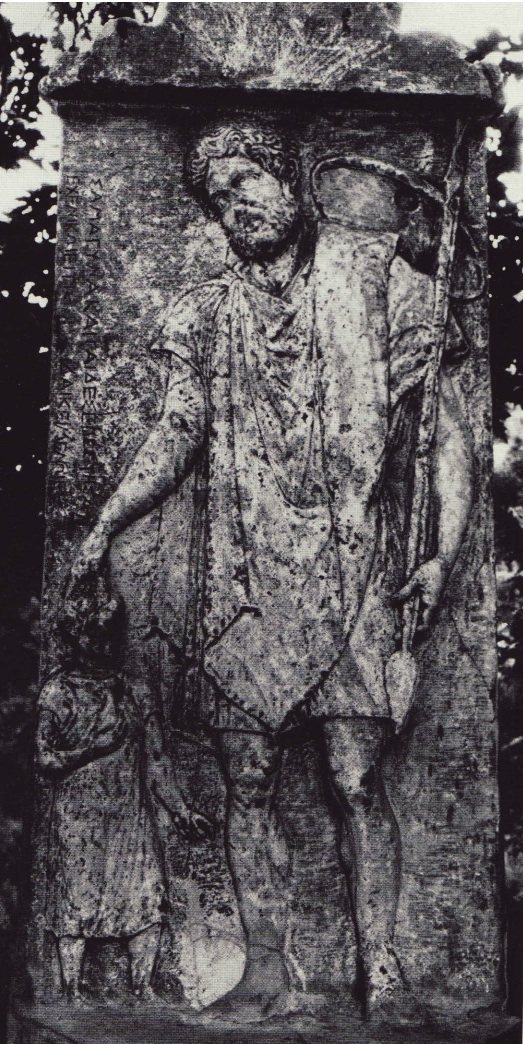
Thessalian grave stela of a man dressed as a hunter

The Thessalians were a Thesprotian tribe (according to Herodotus, vii. 176; Veil. Pat. i. 3), and originally came from the Thesprotian Ephyra. Under the guidance of leaders, who are said to have been descendants of Heracles, they invaded the western part of the country afterwards called Thessaly, and drove out or reduced to the condition of Penestae, or bondsmen, the ancient Aeolian inhabitants. Afterwards, the Thessalians spread over the other parts of the country, taking possession of the most fertile districts and compelling the Peraebi, Magnetes, Achaean Phthiotians and other neighbouring people to submit to their authority and to pay them tribute. Like Laconia, the population of Thessaly therefore consisted of three distinct classes:

1. The Penestae, whose condition was nearly the same as that of the Helots.
2. The subject people, who inhabited the districts not occupied by the Thessalian invaders. They paid tribute, as stated above, but were personally free, though they had no share in the government. They corresponded to the Perioeci of Laconia, by which name they are called by Xenophon.
3. The Thessalian conquerors, who alone had any share in the public administration, and whose lands were cultivated by the Penestae.

For some time after the conquest, Thessaly seems to have been governed by kings of the race of Heracleidae, who may however have been only the heads of the great aristocratic families, invested with the supreme power for a certain time. Under one of these princes, named Aleuas, the country was divided into four districts – Phthiotis, Plistiaeotis, Thessaliotis and Pelasgiotis: This division continued throughout Thessalian history, and it may therefore be concluded that it was not merely a nominal one. Each district may have regulated its affairs by some kind of provincial council, but we are almost entirely in the dark concerning the internal government of each district.

When occasion required, a chief magistrate was elected under the name of tagus, whose commands were obeyed by all four districts. He is sometimes called king (basileus, Herod, v. 63), and sometimes archon (Dionys. v. 74.) He levied soldiers from the states in each district, and seems to have fixed the amount of tribute to be paid by the allies. (Xenoph. Hell. vi. 1. § 19.) When Jason of Pherae was tagus, he had an army of more than 8,000 cavalry and not less than 20,000 hoplites (Xenoph../. c.), and Jason himself says that when Thessaly is under a tagus, there is an army of 6,000 cavalry and 10,000 hoplites. The tribute Jason levied from the subject towns was the same as had been previously paid by one of the Scopadae family, whom Buttmann supposes to be the same Scopas as the one mentioned by Aelian ( V. H. xii. 1) as a contemporary of Cyrus the younger. When Thessaly was not united under the government of a tagus, the subject towns possessed more independence. (Xenoph. Hell. vi. 1. § 9.) In later times, some states called their ordinary magistrates tagoi (Bockh, Corp. Liscr. n. 1770), which may have been done however, as Hermann suggests, only out of affectation.

However, Thessaly was hardly ever united under one government. The different cities administered their own affairs independently of one another, though the smaller towns seem to have frequently "been under the influence of the more important ones (Xenoph. Hell. vi. 1. § 8). In almost all the cities, the form of government was aristocratical ("dynastic rule rather than isonomy", according to Thucyd. iv. 78), and it was chiefly in the hands of a few great families, who were descended from the ancient kings. Thus Larissa was subject to the Aleuadae, whence Herodotus (vii. 6) calls them kings of Thessaly; Cranon or Crannon to the Scopadae, and Pharsalus to the Creondae. (Compare Theocr. xvi. -34, &c.) These nobles had vast estates cultivated by the Penestae; they were celebrated for their hospitality and lived in a princely manner ("hospitable, magnificent, the Thessalian way" Xenoph. Hell. vi. 1. § 3), and they attracted to their courts many of the poets and artists of southern Greece. However, the Thessalian commonality did not submit quietly to the exclusive rule of the nobles. Contests between the two classes seem to have arisen early, and the conjecture of Thirlwall (vol. i. p. 438), that the election of a tagus, like that of a Roman dictator, was sometimes used as an expedient for keeping the commonalty under, appears very probable. At Larissa, the Aleuadae made some concessions to the popular party. Aristotle (Pol. v. 5) speaks, though we do not know at what time he refers to, of certain magistrates at Larissa, who bore the name of politophylakes and exercised a superintendence over the admission of freemen, and were elected themselves out of the body of the people whence they were led to court the people in a way unfavourable to the interests of the aristocracy. There were also other magistrates at Larissa of a democratic kind, called Larissopoioi. (Aristot. Pol. iii. 1.) Besides the contests between the oligarchical and democratical parties, there were feuds among the oligarchs themselves; and such was the state of parties at Larissa under the government of the Aleuadae two generations before the Persian wars, that a magistrate was chosen by mutual consent, perhaps from the commonalty, to mediate between the parties (archon mesidios, Aristot. Pol. v. 5). At Pharsalus too at the close of the Peloponnesian War, the state was torn asunder by internecine commotions and, for the sake of quiet and security, the citizens entrusted the acropolis and the whole direction of the government to Polydamas of Pharsalus, who discharged his trust with the strictest integrity. (Xenoph. Hell. vi. 1. § 2, 3.)

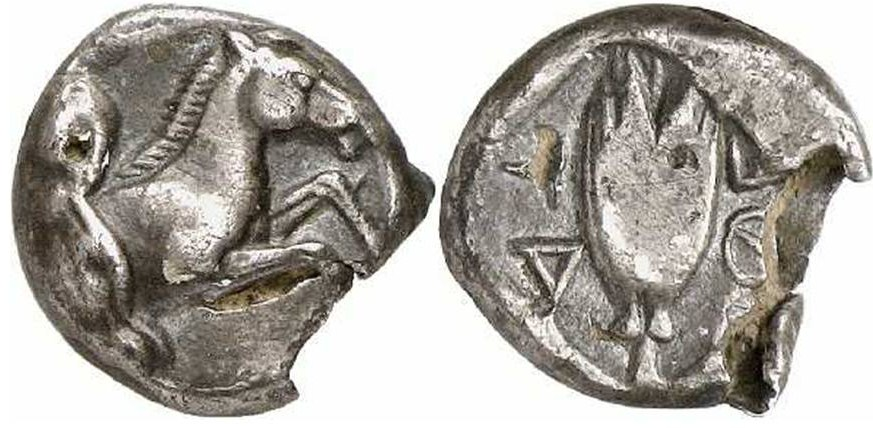
silver hemidrachm of Thessalian League struck 470–460 BC

In the summer of 480 BC, during the Second Persian invasion of Greece, the Persians invaded Thessaly. The Greek army that guarded the Vale of Tempe, evacuated the road before the enemy arrived. Not much later, Thessaly surrendered and the Aleuadae joined the Persians. (See Thorax of Larissa, Thargelia (hetaera))

However, the power of the aristocratical families seems to have continued with little diminution until towards the close of the Peloponnesian War, when decidedly democratic movements first begin to appear. At this time, the Aleuadae and the Scopadae had lost much of their ancient influence. Pherae and Pharsalus then became the two leading states in Thessaly. At Pherae, a tyranny, probably arising from a democracy, was established by Lycophron, who opposed the great aristocratical families and aimed at the dominion of all Thessaly. (Xenoph. Hell. ii. 3. § 4; ^Diod. xiv. 82.) The latter object was accomplished by Jason of Pherae, the successor, and probably the son, of Lycophron, who effected an alliance with Polydamas of Pharsalus and caused himself to be elected tagus about in 374 BC. While he lived, the whole of Thessaly was united as one political power but, after his murder in 370 BC, his family was torn asunder by internecine discords and did not maintain its dominion for long. The office of tagus became a tyranny under his successors, Polydorus, Polyphron, Alexander, Tisiphonus, and Lycophron; until, at length, the old aristocratical families called in the assistance of Philip II of Macedon, who deprived Lycophron of his power in 353 BC, and restored the ancient government in the different towns. At Pherae, he is said to have restored popular, or at least republican, government.(Diod. xvi. 38.) The Thessalian people elected Philip archon tagus of the Thessalian League for life; a few years later (344 BC), he re-established the tetrarchies (or tetradarchie), installing governors devoted to his interests and who were probably members of the ancient noble families. (Demosthen. Philip, ii. p. 71, iii. p. 117; Harpocrat. s. v.). The Thessalian cavalry became also part of the Macedonian army and many Thessalians took part in the campaign of Alexander the Great. At the close of the First Macedonian War, 197 BC, under Flamininus, it was declared free along with Orestis; but ultimately it was incorporated in the Roman province of Macedonia along with Epirus vetus.

== Ancient coinage of Thessaly ==
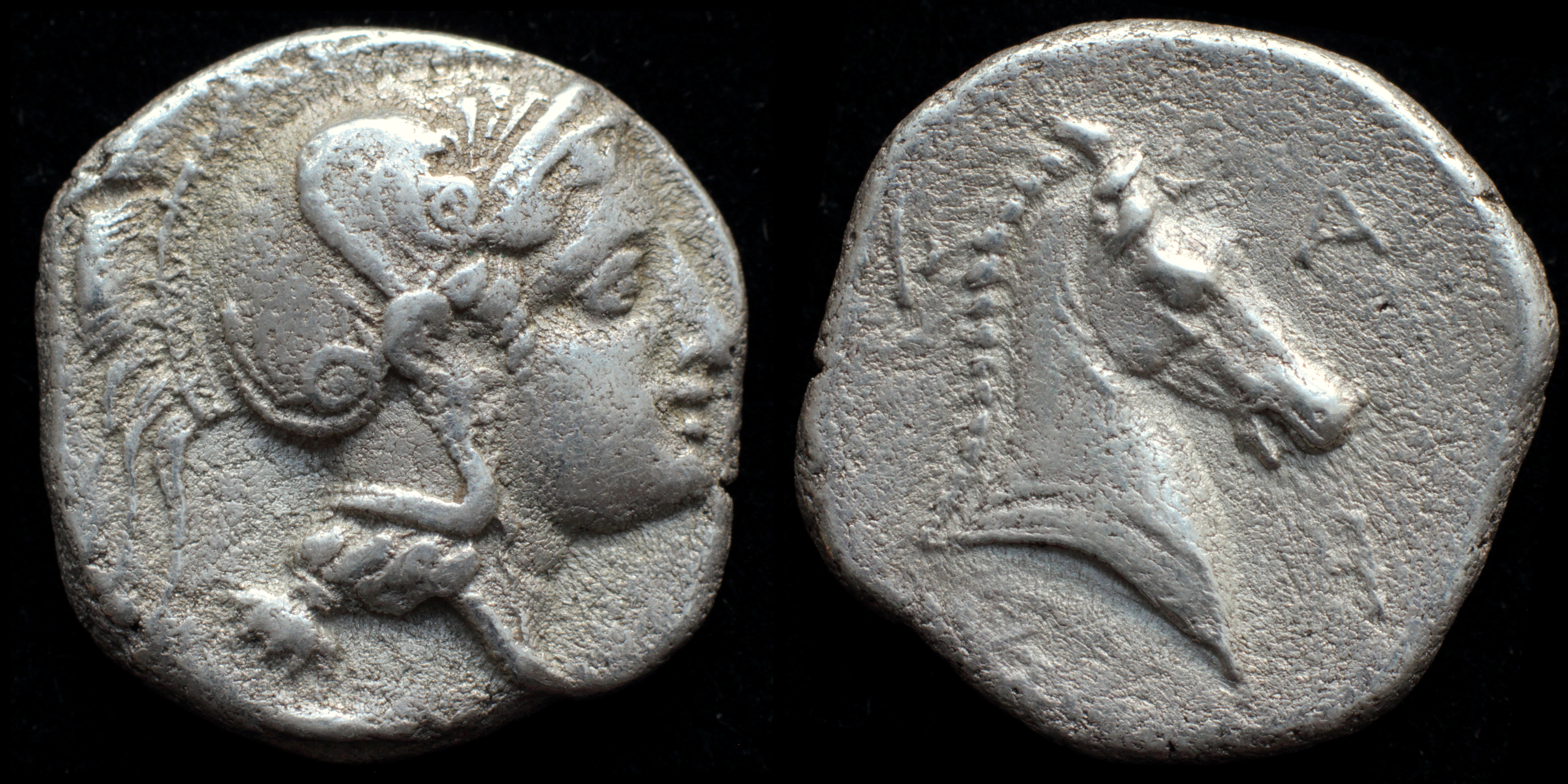
Silver hemidrachm of Pharsalos struck 450–400 BC

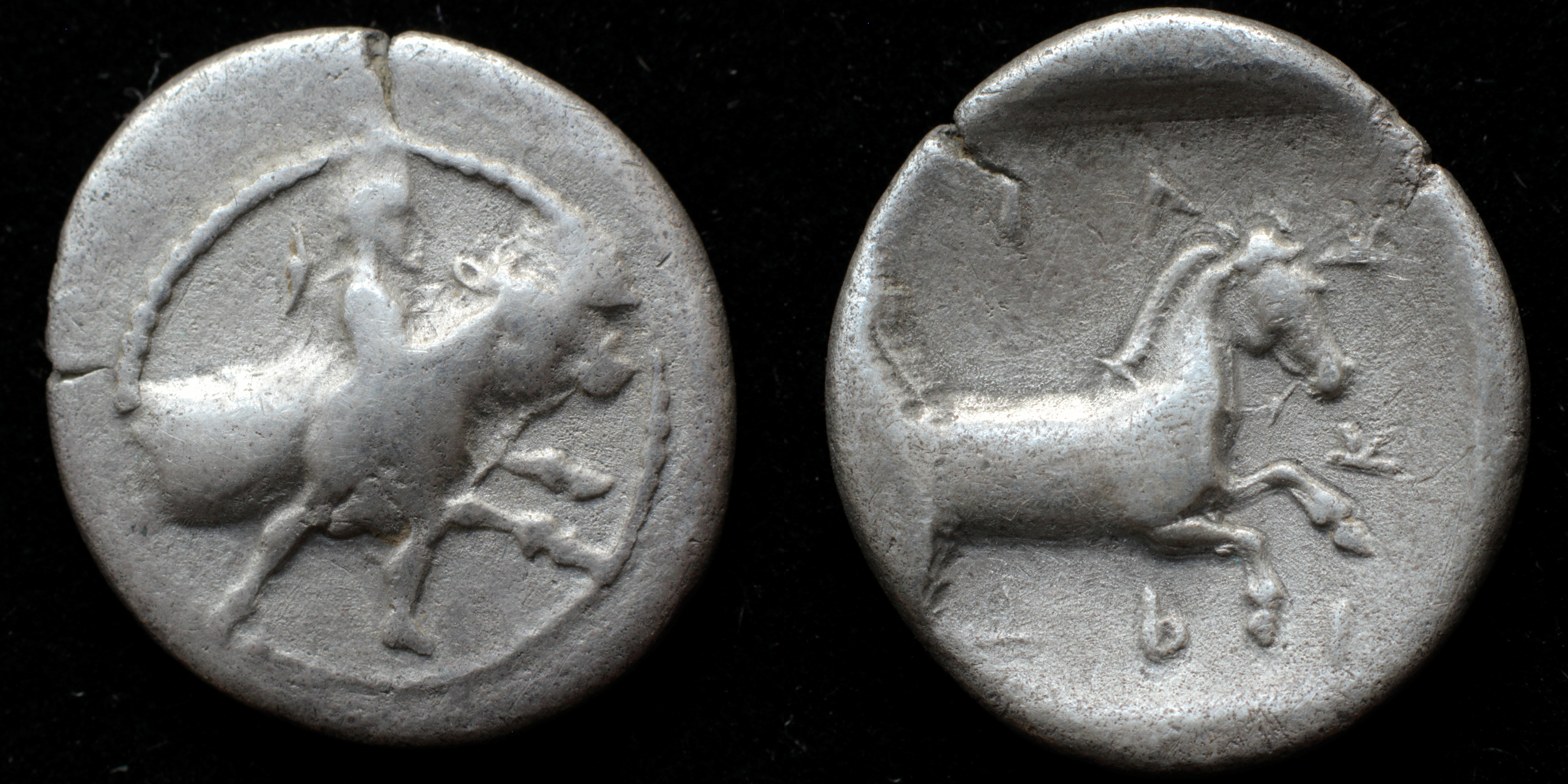
Silver hemidrachm of Trikka struck 440–400 BC

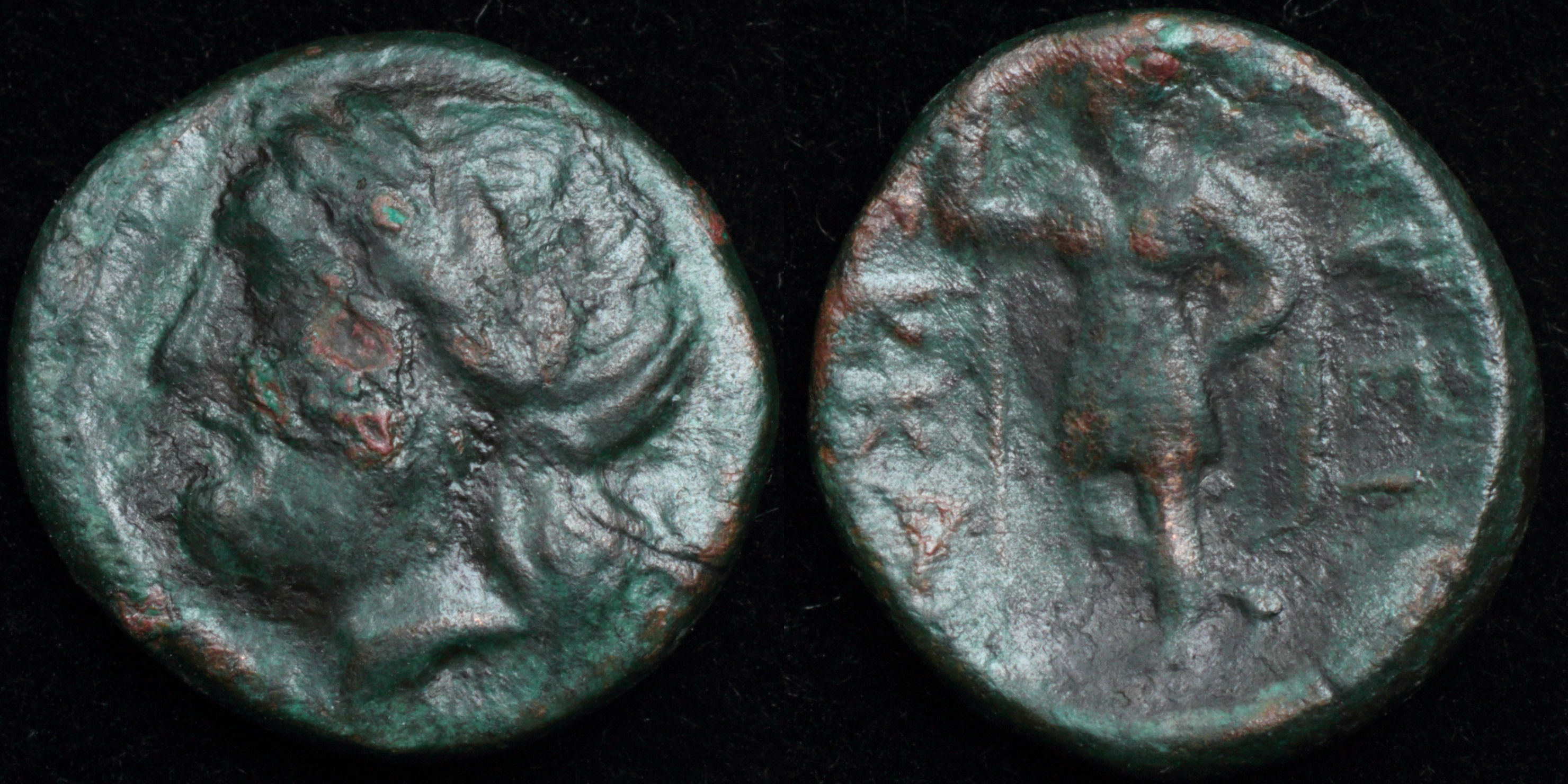
Bronze coin of Ekkarra struck 325–320 BC

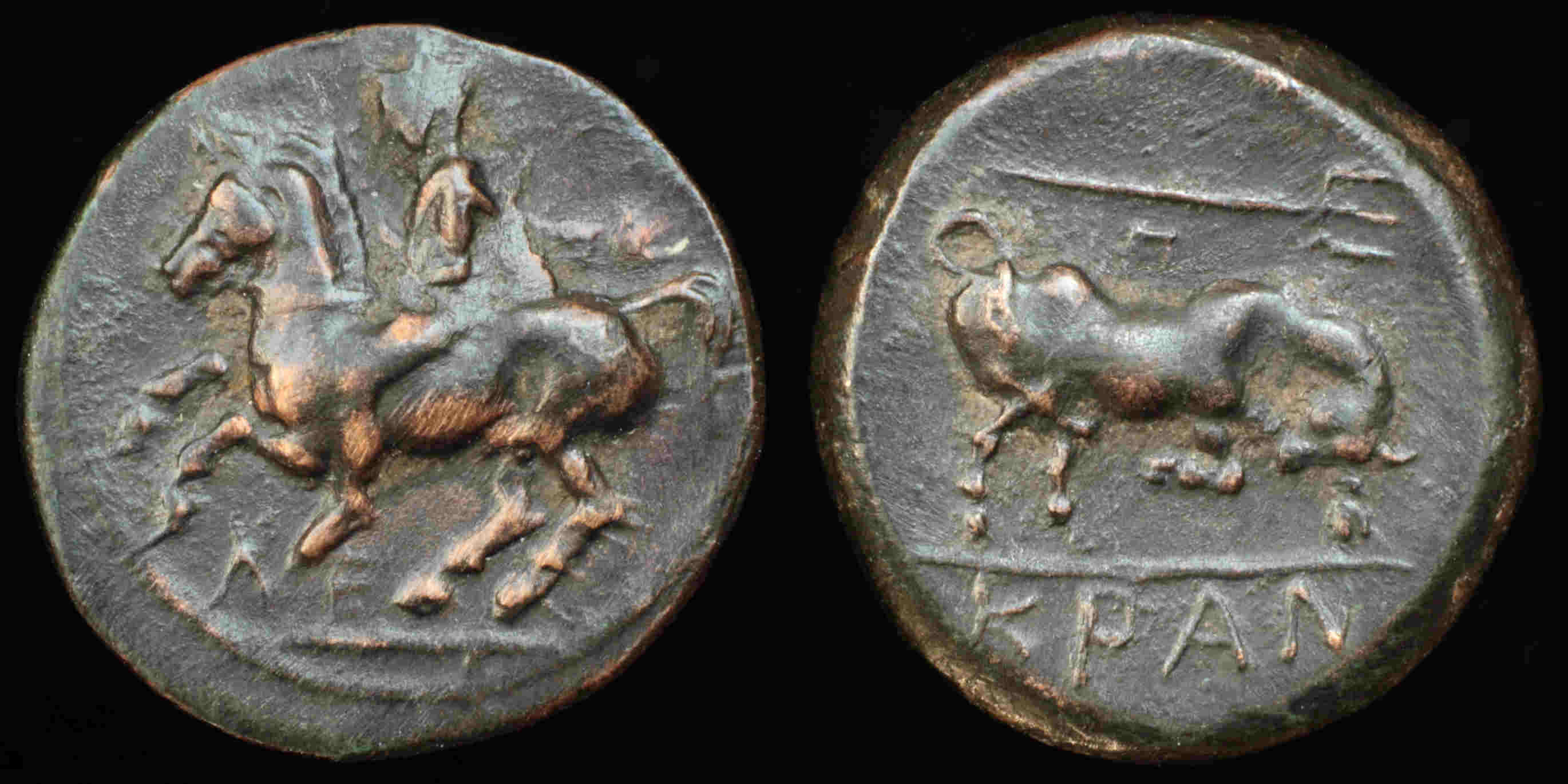
Bronze coin of Krannon struck 400–344 BC

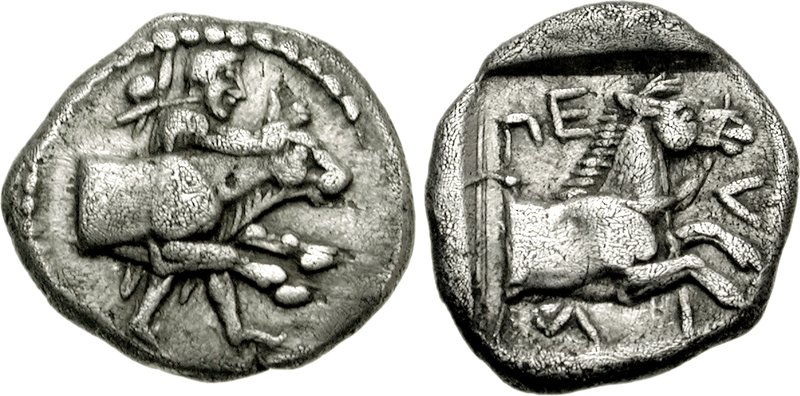
Hemidrachm coin of Pelinna struck 460–420 BC

== See also ==
- Photinaion
- Thessalian League
