= Thetidium =

Town in Thessaliotis in ancient Thessaly

Coordinates: 39°21′36″N 22°30′11″E

Thetidium or Thetidion or Thetideion (Ancient Greek: Θετίδιον, romanized: Thetídion, Θετίδειον, or Θεστίδειον) was a town in Thessaliotis in ancient Thessaly, close to Pharsalus, where Flamininus encamped at the end of the second march from Pherae towards Scotussa, before the Battle of Cynoscephalae in 197 BC. It derived its name from the sea-goddess Thetis, the mother of Achilles, the national hero of the Achaean Phthiotae.

== Legend ==
According to Phylarchus, after Thetis had Hephaestus make armor for her son, he agreed to give the armor to her if she would sleep with him. Thetis agreed, but told him she would have to try it on first, as to see if it would fit her son—mother and son were the same size. Once fully armed, she fled his advances. Hephaestus, in his anger, hit her ankle with a hammer. She landed in Thessaly and healed the wound, and thus the place was named after her.

== Modern site ==
Its site is at a location called Agios Athanasios or Kato Dasolofos, within the boundaries of the modern village of Thetidio, which echoes the ancient name.
