= Thetonium =

Ancient town

Coordinates: 39°19′13″N 22°12′26″E

Thetonium or Thetonion (Ancient Greek: Θητώνιον), also Theton (Θητών), was a town and polis of Thessaliotis in ancient Thessaly.

== History ==
The town is mentioned in an inscription dated between 450-425 BCE, which is the oldest writing where the title of tagus of Thessaly is mentioned. The inscription is an honorary decree for a certain Soter of Corinth. The acting tagus of Thetonium was responsible for compliance with the conditions of this decree. In the same text, it also appears that Thetonium had a ὑλωρός, which was a post that had surveillance functions in rural areas.

Its site is located at a place called Kypritsi, near the modern Gefiria.
