= Polydamas of Thessaly =

Polymas of Thessaly may refer to:

- Polydamas of Skotoussa, wrestler
- Polydamas of Pharsalus in Thessaly. He was entrusted by his fellow-citizens about 375 BC, with the supreme government of their native town

== See also ==
- Polydamas (disambiguation)
