= Polydorus of Pherae =

Tyrant of Pherae and Tagus in 370 BC

Polydorus (Ancient Greek: Πολύδωρος) was a tyrant of Pherae and Tagus of the Thessalian League (370 BC).

When Jason of Pherae was murdered in 370 BC, Polydorus succeeded him together with his brother Polyphron, and the brothers shared the power as co-tyrants. However this dual tyranny did not last long, as Polydorus was murdered in his sleep by Polyphron the same year.
