= Thargelia (hetaera) =

Ancient Greek hetaera

Thargelia (Ancient Greek: Θαργηλία) was a renowned hetaera and later queen in ancient Greece who is said to have been married fourteen times.

According to Plutarch, she was born in Ionia and "made her onslaughts upon the most influential men" of her times. Thargelia was noted for her physical beauty and was endowed with grace of manners as well as clever wits. Plutarch asserts that Thargelia "attached all her consorts to the King of Persia" and sought for the spreading of Persian sympathy in the cities of Greece by means of her clients, "who were men of the greatest power and influence". She is said to have lived for a long time in Thessaly, where she successfully propagandized the Persian policy.

Thargelia married Antiochus, the tagus of the Thessalian League and ruler of Pharsalus, and after his death, she ruled for 30 years, from c. 510 BC to c. 480 BC, probably as queen of Pharsalus.
