= Cynoscephalae Hills (Thessaly) =

Range of hills in ancient Thessaly

Coordinates: 39°25′N 22°34′E

Cynoscephalae (Ancient Greek: Κυνὸς κεφαλαί, meaning "dog's heads") was the name of a range of hills in ancient Thessaly, a little to the south of Scotussa, in whose territory they were situated. They are described by Polybius as rugged, broken, and of considerable height; and are memorable as the scene of two battles: Battle of Cynoscephalae (364 BC), between the Thebans and Alexander of Pherae, in which Pelopidas was slain; and Battle of Cynoscephalae (197 BC), of still greater celebrity, in which Philip V of Macedon was defeated by the Roman consul Titus Quinctius Flamininus.
