= Chalkiades =

Chalkiades (Greek: Χαλκιάδες) may refer to two villages in Greece:

- Chalkiades, Arta, a village in the Arta regional unit, part of the municipal unit Filothei
- Chalkiades, Larissa, a village in the Larissa regional unit, part of the municipal unit Polydamantas
