= 369 BC =

Notable events of the calendar year

369 BC in various calendars
Gregorian calendar	369 BC; CCCLXIX BC
Ab urbe condita	385
Ancient Egypt era	XXX dynasty, 12
Pharaoh	Nectanebo I, 12
Ancient Greek Olympiad (summer)	102nd Olympiad, year 4
Assyrian calendar	4382
Balinese saka calendar	N/A
Bengali calendar	−962 – −961
Berber calendar	582
Buddhist calendar	176
Burmese calendar	−1006
Byzantine calendar	5140–5141
Chinese calendar	辛亥年 (Metal Pig); 2329 or 2122 — to — 壬子年 (Water Rat); 2330 or 2123
Coptic calendar	−652 – −651
Discordian calendar	798
Ethiopian calendar	−376 – −375
Hebrew calendar	3392–3393
- Hindu calendars
Vikram Samvat	−312 – −311
Shaka Samvat	N/A
Kali Yuga	2732–2733
Holocene calendar	9632
Iranian calendar	990 BP – 989 BP
Islamic calendar	1020 BH – 1019 BH
Javanese calendar	N/A
Julian calendar	N/A
Korean calendar	1965
Minguo calendar	2280 before ROC 民前2280年
Nanakshahi calendar	−1836
Thai solar calendar	174–175
Tibetan calendar	阴金猪年 (female Iron-Pig) −242 or −623 or −1395 — to — 阳水鼠年 (male Water-Rat) −241 or −622 or −1394

Year 369 BC was a year of the pre-Julian Roman calendar. At the time, it was known as the Year of the Tribunate of Fidenas, Cicurinus, Cossus, Cornelius, Cincinnatus and Ambustus (or, less frequently, year 385 Ab urbe condita). The denomination 369 BC for this year has been used since the early medieval period, when the Anno Domini calendar era became the prevalent method in Europe for naming years.

== Events ==
=== By place ===
==== Greece ====
- After driving off the Spartan army that has threatened Mantinea, Epaminondas of Thebes moves south and crosses the Evrotas River (the frontier of Sparta), which no hostile army has breached in historical memory. The Spartans, unwilling to engage the massive Theban army in battle, remain inside their city while the Thebans and their allies ravage Laconia.
- Epaminondas briefly returns to Arcadia, then marches south to Messenia, a territory which the Spartans had conquered some 200 years before. There, Epaminondas starts the rebuilding of the ancient city of Messene on Mount Ithome, with fortifications that are among the strongest in Greece. He then issues a call to Messenian exiles all over Greece to return and rebuild their homeland. The loss of Messenia is particularly damaging to the Spartans, since the territory comprises one-third of Sparta's territory and contains half of their helot population.
- On returning to Thebes, Epaminondas is put on trial by his political enemies who charge that he has retained his command longer than constitutionally permitted. While this charge is considered to be true, Epaminondas persuades the Thebans that this has been necessary to protect Thebes and its allies and reduce the power of Sparta. As a result, the charges against him are dropped.
- In a search for a balance of power against the now powerful Thebes, Athens responds to an appeal for help from Sparta and allies itself with its traditional enemy.
- On the death of the Macedonian King Amyntas III, his eldest son Alexander II becomes king. The young king is simultaneously faced with an Illyrian invasion from the north-west and an attack from the east by the pretender of the Macedonian throne, Pausanias (who quickly captures several cities and threatens the queen mother, Eurydice). Alexander defeats his enemies with the help of the Athenian general Iphicrates, who has been sailing along the Macedonian coast on the way to recapture Amphipolis.
- Alexander of Pherae becomes tyrant of Thessaly following the death of his father. Alexander's tyranny causes the Aleuadae of Larissa to seek the help of Alexander II of Macedon. Alexander II successfully gains control of Larissa and several other cities but, betraying a promise he has made, put garrisons in them. This provokes a hostile reaction from Thebes. The Theban general Pelopidas drives the Macedonians from Thessaly.
- Pelopidas forces Alexander to abandon his alliance with Athens in favour of Thebes by threatening to support Alexander's brother-in-law, Ptolemy of Aloros. As part of this new alliance, Alexander is compelled to hand over hostages, including his younger brother Philip, the future conqueror of Greece.
- Cleomenes II succeeds his brother Agesipolis II as Agiad king of Sparta.

== Births ==
- Zhuang Zhou, Chinese Taoist philosopher

== Deaths ==
- Amyntas III, king of Macedonia
- Theaetetus, Athenian mathematician (b. c. 417 BC)
- Zhou Lie Wang, king of the Zhou dynasty
