= Thetidio =

Village in Thessaly, Greece

Coordinates: 39°22′N 22°31′E

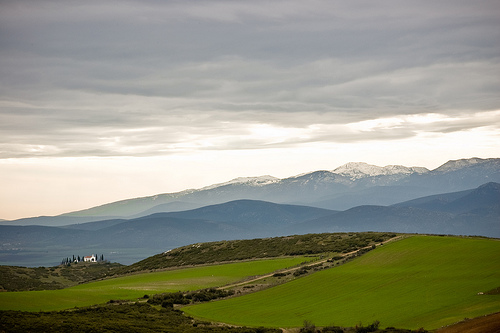

Thetidio is a small village located in Thessaly, central Greece. It is named after Thetis, the mother of Achilles. It is part of the municipal unit of Polydamantas within the municipality of Farsala.
