= Scotussa =

Town and polis (city-state) of Pelasgiotis in ancient Thessaly

- Σκοτοῦσσα (Ancient Greek)
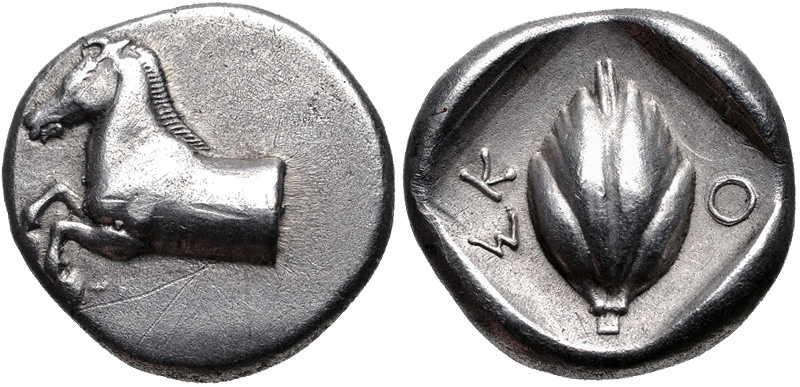
- A fifth-century drachma of Scotussa, inscribed with the identifier ΣΚΟ ('SCO')

- Location within Greece
- 39°23′07″N 22°32′25″E
- Periods: Neolithic; Mycenaean; Early Iron Age; Classical; Roman
- Region: Thessaly

History
- Abandoned: After 48 BCE

Scotussa or Skotoussa (Ancient Greek: Σκοτοῦσσα or Σκοτοῦσα or Σκοτοτοῦσαι) was a town and polis (city-state) in the region of Pelasgiotis in ancient Thessaly. It was between Pherae and Pharsalus, near the border of Phthiotis, about 20 km (12 mi) to the west of Pherae.

Scotussa shows evidence of human activity from the Neolithic period onwards, including a Mycenaean settlement in the Late Helladic period which persisted into the Early Iron Age. It is not mentioned in Homer, though the geographer Strabo records an early tradition that the oracle of Dodona in Epirus originally came from this place. It was the home city of Polydamas, who won the pankration at the Olympic Games of 408 BCE. Xenophon records that the people of Scotussa, alongside the other peoples of Thessaly, fought against Agesilaus II of Sparta when he marched his forces through the region in 394 BCE. The city was taken by Alexander, tyrant of the nearby city of Pherae, in 367 BCE: it had previously been wealthy, and Alexander massacred its people, putting an end to its prosperity.

The territory of Scotussa included the Cynoscephalae Hills, at which Alexander was defeated in 364 BCE at the Battle of Cynoscephalae by an allied force of Thebans and Thessalians led by the Theban general Pelopidas: this battle ended Alexander's hegemony over Thessaly.

Scotussa was prominent during the late fourth century, during period of Macedonian hegemony over northern Greece, and in the ensuing Hellenistic period. Between 346 and 330 BCE, the city may have expanded its fortification walls and established a religious cult of Polydamas. It became a member of the Thessalian League after 197 BCE. In that year, Scotussa was the site of a second Battle of Cynoscephalae, between the Macedonian king Philip V and the Roman consul Titus Quinctius Flamininus: the Macedonians were defeated, ending Macedonian hegemony over the region and establishing Roman dominance over Greece. It was taken by the Seleucid king Antiochus III in 191 BCE, but soon after retaken by the Roman consul Manius Acilius Glabrio. At some point in the early Roman period, its eastern gate and a large public building collapsed, possibly as the result of an earthquake, and were never rebuilt. Scotussa is mentioned by Plutarch as inhabited in 48 BCE, during the civil war between Julius Caesar and Pompey, but described as uninhabited by Pausanias, who wrote in the second century CE.

The ruins of Scotussa are at Agia Triada in the municipality of Farsala, and are known as "Portes" ('Gates'). Most of the walls have been lost, though they appear to have been around 2 to 3 miles (3.2 to 4.8 km) in circumference, with an acropolis towards the southwest. A joint Greek and Italian team began archaeological investigation of the site in 2014, including a large-scale survey of the ancient city.
