= Cranon =

Town and polis (city-state) of Pelasgiotis in ancient Thessaly

Coordinates: 39°30′02″N 22°18′09″E

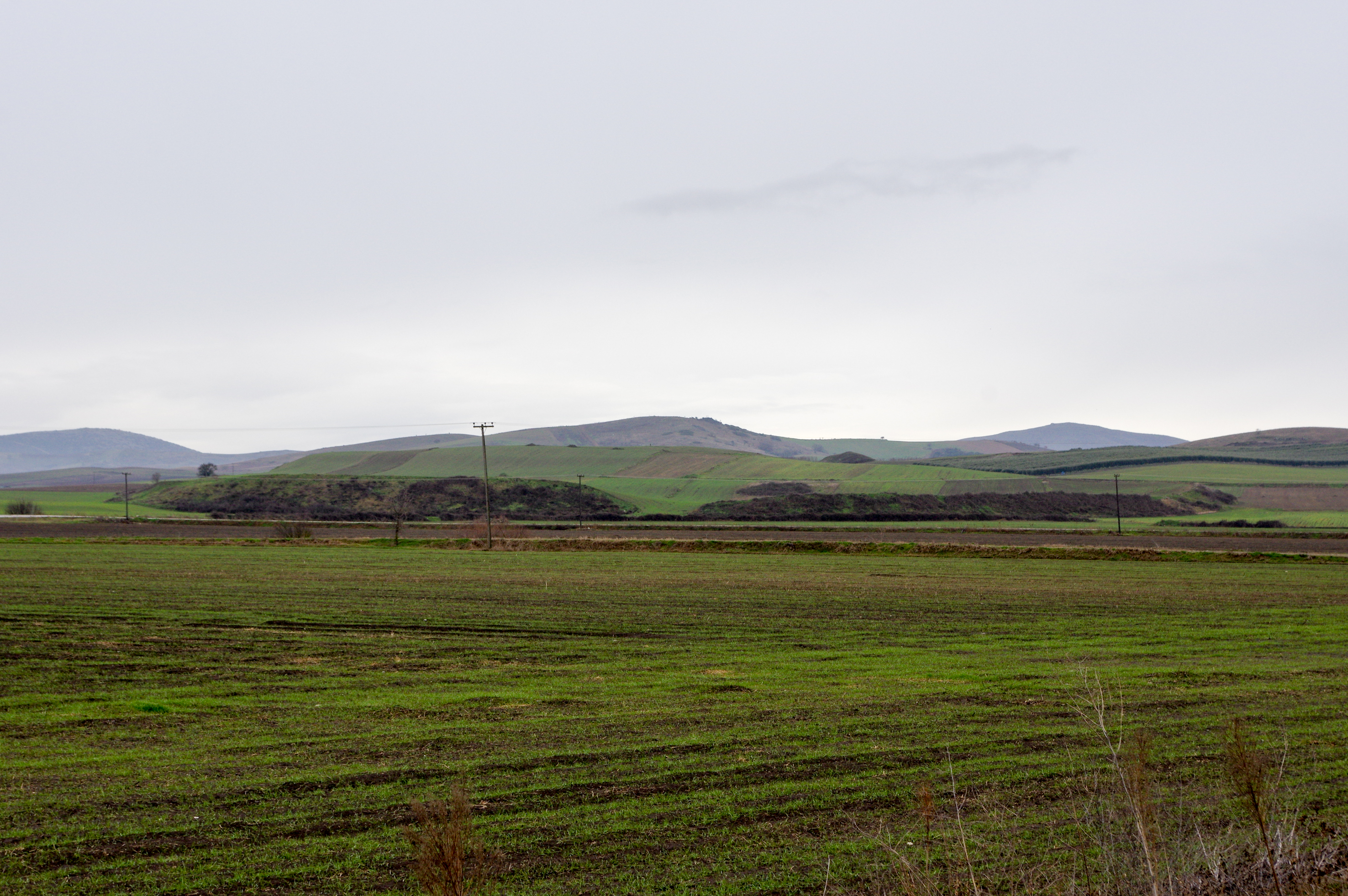
The site of Palealarisa, ancient Krannon.

Cranon (Ancient Greek: Κρανών) or Crannon (Κραννών) was a town and polis (city-state) of Pelasgiotis, in ancient Thessaly, situated southwest of Larissa, and at the distance of 100 stadia from Gyrton, according to Strabo. Spelling differs among the sources: Κράννων and ῂ Κράννωνοϛ; Κραννών, Κράννουν, and Κράννουϛ. To the west it bounded with the territory of Atrax and to the east with that of Scotussa. To the south the ridges of the Revenia separated it from the valley of the river Enipeus.

Its most ancient name is said to have been Ephyra (Ὲφύρη or Ὲφύρα), so called prior to the arrival of the Thessalians; and Homer, in his account of the wars of the Ephyri and Phlegyae, is supposed by the ancient commentators to have meant the people afterwards called Crannonians and Gyrtonians respectively. Pindar likewise speaks of the Crannonii under the name of Ephyraei.

In the Ancient Olympic Games of 648 BCE, Crauxidas the Crannonian (or Craxilas) won the horse race. In the 6th century BCE the most prominent family in the city's political life was the Scopadae, whose numerous flocks and herds grazed in the fertile plain surrounding the city. Diactorides, one of the Scopadae of Crannon, was a suitor for the hand of the daughter of Cleisthenes of Sicyon. Simonides of Ceos resided some time at Crannon, under the patronage of the Scopadae; and there was a celebrated story current in antiquity respecting the mode in which the Dioscuri preserved the poet's life when the Scopadae were crushed by the falling in of the roof of a building.

In the first year of the Peloponnesian War (431 BCE) the Crannonians, together with some of the other Thessalians, sent troops to the assistance of the Athenians. In 394 BCE they are mentioned as allies of the Boeotians, who molested Spartan king Agesilaus II in his march through Thessaly on his return from Asia.

In 369 BCE the Aleuadae conspired with the inhabitants of Larissa to overthrow the tyrant Alexander of Pherae. They convinced the king of Macedon Alexander II to help them. While the tyrant was busy with the recruitment of troops, Alexander II presented himself with his army in Larissa and seized the city. He then took the acropolis and, afterwards Cranon was won for his cause, and Alexander II presumably established a garrison at Cranon. That garrison was probably withdrawn as was a similar one from Larissa when Pelopidas at the head of the Boeotian forces invited by the Thessalians arrived to liberate their cities and overthrow the tyranny of Alexander of Pherae.

After the Battle of Chaeronea (338 BCE), the Phocians fought in Lamia and in the Battle of Crannon against Antipater and his army. This was the decisive battle of the Lamian War between Macedon and Athens with its allies.

In 191 BCE, Crannon was taken by Selecuid king Antiochus III. It is mentioned again in the war with Perseus of Macedon. Catullus speaks of it as a declining place in his time (first century BCE): "Deseritur Scyros: linquunt Phthiotica Tempe, Cranonisque domos, ac moenia Larissaea." Its name occurs in Pliny.

In a stele of the first century BCE, an inscription related to a certain Polixenus, son of Minomachus, appears in an act of emancipation at Cranon as a strategos and as a manumitor. As he liberates a slave in this city and the inscription does not specify his ethnicity, Bruno Helly deduces that he was from Cranon, contradicting the opinion of Friedrich Stählin, who claimed that "no strategoi of Thessaly originating in Cranon are found."

== Polis ==
The first epigraphic reference to the polis of the Cranionians (πόλις Κραννουνίων) is in an honorific decree of the 3rd century BCE.

== Archaeology ==
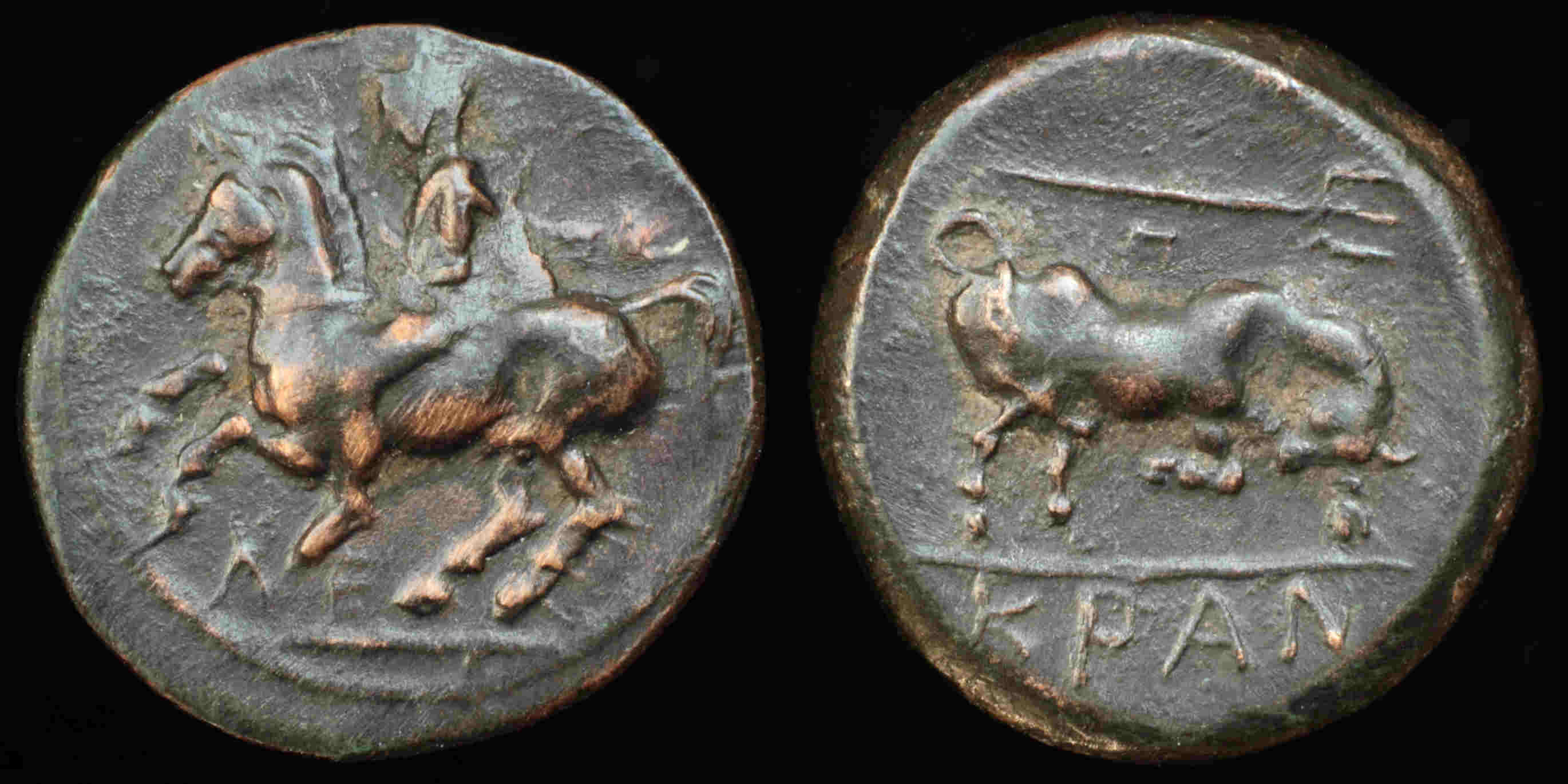
O: Horseman

Λ E

R: Bull, trident above

IΠ/KPAN

bronze coin from Cranon struck 400-344 BC.

There are ruins of Cranon at a place called Palealarissa, in the modern municipal unit of Krannonas.

At an indeterminate date Cranon was a walled and fortified city, but almost nothing is known about the urban centre and the acropolis, except for a possible temple of Athena Polias erected on it. There were also temples of Aesclepius, Apollo, Poseidon and Zeus. The city minted silver coins in the fifth century BCE (480-400 BCE) and bronze coins in the fourth century BCE. Drachmas, tetrobols, triobols, obols and hemiobols of the Aeginan type have been preserved, with the legend ΚΡΑ or ΚΡΑΝ or ΚΡΑΝΟ.
