= Chalkiades, Larissa =

Chalkiades Χαλκιάδες
- Community
- Location within Greece
- Coordinates: 39°24′N 22°26′E
- Country: Greece
- Administrative region: Thessaly
- Regional unit: Larissa
- Municipality: Farsala
- Municipal unit: Polydamantas

Population (2021)
  - Community: 279
- Time zone: UTC+2 (EET)
  - Summer (DST): UTC+3 (EEST)
- Vehicle registration: ΡΙ

Chalkiades (Greek: Χαλκιάδες) is a village in the south of the Larissa regional unit, Greece. It is part of the municipal unit of Polydamantas. Chalkiades is located in the Thessalian Plain, 12 km north of Farsala and 27 km south of Larissa. The Greek National Road 3 passes through the village.

== Population ==
Historical population
Year	Pop.	±%
1981	674	—
1991	590	−12.5%
2001	652	+10.5%
2011	363	−44.3%
2021	279	−23.1%

== History ==
Chalkiades consists of two settlements: Ano Chalkiades and Kato Chalkiades. Ano Chalkiades was founded by refugees who fled from Cappadocia during the Greco-Turkish War (1919–1922).
