= Polydamas =

Polydamas or Poludamas (Greek: Πολυδάμας), feminine Polydama or Polydamna, may refer to:

- Polydamas (mythology), Trojan hero
- Polydamas of Skotoussa, Thessalian wrestler, victor at the Olympiad of 408 BC
- Polydamas of Pharsalus (died 370 BC or later), Thessalian statesman
- Polydamas of Macedon, 4th century BC Macedonian general under Alexander the Great

== See also ==
- Battus polydamas, butterfly species
- Polydamna, wife of Thon
