= Aleuas =

Aleuas (Greek: Ἀλεύας) (IPA /aːλeyːəs/), in Modern Greek Alevas, can refer to more than one person from ancient Greek myth and history:

- Aleuas, the mythical king and seer of Thessaly who was the eponymous ancestor of the noble Aleuadae family of Larissa. See: Aleuadae.
- Aleuas, a historical artist who was famous in his day for his statues of philosophers.
