= Panormus (Attica) =

Coordinates: 37°41′59″N 24°03′33″E

Panormus or Panormos (Ancient Greek: Πάνορμος) was a harbour on the east coast of ancient Attica. Panormus was captured by Alexander of Pherae during the latter's expedition in Attica. The Athenian admiral Leosthenes defeated Alexander, but Alexander escaped from being blockaded in Panormus, took several Attic triremes, and plundered Piraeus.

Its site is located near the modern Panormo.
