= Photinaion =

Town in ancient Thessaly

Photinaion (Ancient Greek: Φωτίναιον) was a town in ancient Thessaly. It is unlocated.
