= Polydamantas =

Polydamantas Πολυδάμαντας
- Municipal unit
- Location within the regional unit

- Location within Greece
- Coordinates: 39°20′N 22°26′E
- Country: Greece
- Administrative region: Thessaly
- Regional unit: Larissa
- Municipality: Farsala

Area
  - Municipal unit: 292.591 km^{2} (112.970 sq mi)

Population (2021)
  - Municipal unit: 3,214
  - Municipal unit density: 10.98/km^{2} (28.45/sq mi)
- Time zone: UTC+2 (EET)
  - Summer (DST): UTC+3 (EEST)
- Vehicle registration: ΡΙ

Polydamantas (Greek: Πολυδάμαντας) is a former municipality in the Larissa regional unit, Thessaly, Greece. Since the 2011 local government reform it is part of the municipality Farsala, of which it is a municipal unit. Population 3,214 (2021). The municipal unit has an area of 292.951 km^{2}. The seat of the municipality was in Vamvakou. The name of the municipality comes from Polydamas of Skotoussa (Ancient Greek: Πολυδάμας, gen. Πολυδάμαντος, Polydámas, Polydámantos (ὁ Σκοτουσσαῖος), son of Nicias), a Thessalian pankratiast, and victor in the 93rd Olympiad (408 BC), who was born in the village of Scotussa or the nearby Polydàmio.
