= Thorax of Larissa =

Ancient Thessalian Greek, member of the powerful Aleuadae family

Thorax (Greek: Θώραξ) of Larissa in Thessaly was a member of the powerful family of the Aleuadae. He was a son of an Aleuas who was a friend of the poet Simonides.

Thorax and his brothers, Eurypylus and Thrasydaeus, wishing to confirm or to increase their power, were among those who urged Xerxes to invade Greece, and promised him their assistance in the enterprise. In Xerxes' retreat, after the Battle of Salamis, Thorax formed one of his escort, after which he still continued to show his zeal in the cause of the invaders, and was present with Mardonius at the Battle of Plataea in 479 BC. When the Persians had been finally driven from Greece, Leotychidas, king of Sparta, led an army into Thessaly to punish those who had sided with the barbarians, but the Aleuadae bribed him to refrain from making reprisals against their kin.
