= Aleuadae =

Ancient Greek family

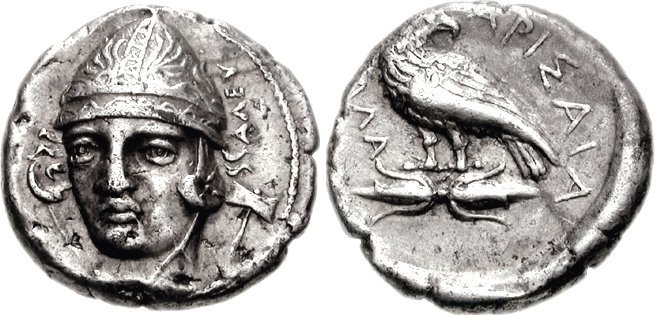
Coinage of Thessaly, possibly king Hellokrates, with portrait of Aleuas. Obv: Head of Aleuas facing slightly left, wearing conical helmet, ALEU to right; labrys behind. Rev: Eagle standing right, head left, on thunderbolt; ELLA to left, LARISAIA to right. Thessaly, Larissa. Circa 370-360 BC

The Aleuadae (Ancient Greek: Ἀλευάδαι) were an ancient Thessalian family of Larissa, who claimed descent from the mythical Aleuas (Ἀλεύας). The Aleuadae were the noblest and most powerful among all the families of Thessaly, whence Herodotus calls its members "rulers" or "kings" (βασιλεῖς).

== Aleuas ==
The first Aleuas, who bore the epithet of Pyrrhos (Πύρρος), that is, "red-haired", is called king, or Tagus, of Thessaly, and a descendant of Heracles through Thessalus. Aleuas played no role his eponymous dynasty outside his kinship's veneration of him at an unidentified sanctuary in Thessaly, but Aelian recorded the myth of how he became a divinely-inspired seer, in the fashion of a gift from a serpent: while he was tending sheep on the slopes of Mount Ossa, a serpent became enamored of him, kissed his hair, licked his face and brought him gifts. According to the Bibliotheca, a grateful brood of serpents, in return for his having erected a funeral pyre for their serpent-mother, purified his ears with their tongues, so that he might understand the language of birds, and interpret their flight in augury.

Plutarch wrote that he was hated by his father on account of his haughty and savage character; but his uncle nevertheless contrived to get him elected king and sanctified by the god of Delphi. His reign was more glorious than that of any of his ancestors, and the nation rose in power and importance. This Aleuas belongs to the mythical period of Greek history. According to Aristotle the division of Thessaly into four parts took place in the reign of the first Aleuas. German philologist Philipp Karl Buttmann places this hero in the period between the so-called return of the Heraclids and the age of Peisistratus.

== Historical Aleuadae ==
But even earlier than the time of Peisistratus the family of the Aleuadae appears to have become divided into two branches, the Aleuadae and the Scopadae, called after Scopas (though not the sculptor Scopas). The Scopadae inhabited Crannon and perhaps Pharsalus also, while the main branch, the Aleuadae, remained at Larissa. The influence of the families, however, was not confined to these towns, but extended more or less over the greater part of Thessaly. They formed in reality a powerful aristocratic party (βασιλεῖς) in opposition to the great body of the Thessalians. For many generations the Aleuadae enjoyed the privilege of furnishing the Tagus, or chief commander, of the combined forces of Thessaly.

The earliest historical person who probably belongs to the Aleuadae is the general Eurylochus, who terminated the First Sacred War about 590 BC. In the time of the poet Simonides we find a second Aleuas, who was a friend of the poet. He is called a son of Simus; but besides the suggestion of Ovid that he had a tragic end, nothing is known about him. At the time when Xerxes invaded Greece, three sons of this Aleuas, Thorax, Eurypylus, and Thrasydaeus, came to him as ambassadors, to request him to go on with the war, and to promise him their assistance. When, after the Persian war, Leotychides was sent to Thessaly to chastise those who had acted as traitors to their country, he allowed himself to be bribed by the Aleuadae, although he might have subdued all Thessaly. This fact shows that the power of the Aleuadae was then still as great as before. Around 460 BC we find an Aleuad named "Orestes", son of Echecratides, who came to Athens as a fugitive, and persuaded the Athenians to exert themselves for his restoration. He had been expelled either by the Thessalians or more probably by a faction of his own family, who wished to exclude him from the dignity of basileus (βασιλεύς) (that is, probably Tagus), for such feuds among the Aleuadae themselves are frequently mentioned.

After the end of the Peloponnesian War, another Thessalian family, the dynasts of Pherae, gradually rose to power and influence, and gave a great shock to the power of the Aleuadae. As early as 375 BC, Jason of Pherae, after various struggles, succeeded in raising himself to the dignity of Tagus. When the dynasts of Pherae became tyrannical, some of the Larissaean Aleuadae conspired to put an end to their rule, and for this purpose they invited Alexander II, son of Amyntas III. Alexander took Larissa and Crannon, but kept them to himself. Afterwards, Pelopidas restored the original state of things in Thessaly; but the dynasts of Pherae soon recovered their power, and the Aleuadae again solicited the assistance of Macedonia against them. Philip willingly complied with the request, broke the power of the tyrants of Pherae, restored the towns to an appearance of freedom, and made the Aleuadae his faithful friends and allies. In what manner Philip used them for his purposes, and how little he spared them when it was his interest to do so, is sufficiently attested.

Among the tetrarchs whom he entrusted with the administration of Thessaly, there is one Thrasydaeus, who undoubtedly belonged to the Aleuadae, just as the Thessalian Medius, who is mentioned as one of the companions of Alexander the Great. The family now sank into insignificance, and the last certain trace of an Aleuad is Thorax, a friend of Antigonus. Whether the sculptors Aleuas, mentioned by Pliny, and Scopas of Paros, were in any way connected with the Aleuadae, cannot be ascertained.
