= Polydamas of Pharsalus =

4th century BC Thessalian statesman

Polydamas of Pharsalus (Ancient Greek: Πολυδάμας, gen. Πολυδάμαντος, Polydámas, Polydámantos) was a Thessalian statesman from Farsala (Ancient Pharsalos). He was entrusted by his fellow-citizens about 375 BC, with the supreme government of their native town. Polydamas formed an alliance with Sparta, with which state his family had long been connected by the bonds of public hospitality (proxeny), but he soon after entered into a treaty with Jason of Pherae. On the murder of Jason in 370 BC, his brother Polyphron, who succeeded to his power, put to death Polydamas and eight other most distinguished citizens of Pharsalus.
