= Jason of Pherae =

4th-century BCE Tyrant of Pherae, Tagus (overlord) of Ancient Thessaly

Jason of Pherae (Ancient Greek: Ἰάσων ὁ Φεραῖος) was the ruler of Thessaly during the period just before Philip II of Macedon came to power. He had succeeded Lycophron I of Pherae, possibly his father, as tyrant of Pherae and was appointed tagus, or chief magistrate, of Thessaly in the 370s BC and soon extended his control to much of the surrounding region. Controlling a highly trained mercenary force as well as the famous Thessalian cavalry, Jason briefly transformed Thessaly into a powerful Greek state and even spoke of invading the Persian Empire.

== Life ==
The geographer Pausanias records that Jason was familiar with the teachings of the Sophist Gorgias (6.17.9), and Isocrates claims to have been in contact with Jason, though none of this correspondence survives.(To the Children of Jason 1.1)

Aristotle records Jason as saying that "he had to do some few unjust things in order to do many just ones" in the Rhetoric Book I Chapter 12 Bekker lines 1373a25-27. ὥσπερ ἔφη Ἰάσων ὁ Θετταλὸς δεῖν ἀδικεῖν ἔνια, ὅπως δύνηται καὶ δίκαια πολλὰ ποιεῖν (Ross, 1959).

== Military organization and foreign policy ==
The figure of Jason makes a sudden appearance in the history of classical Greece with Xenophon swiftly mentioning his name during his commentary on Theban hegemony during the 370s. From seemingly out of nowhere arose a very ambitious proto-Philip general with a large and competent army. Xenophon quotes Jason as claiming:

I have men of other states as mercenaries to the number of six thousand, with whom, as I think, no city could easily contend. As for numbers,' he said, `of course as great a force might march out of some other city also; but armies made up of citizens include men who are already advanced in years and others who have not yet come to their prime. Furthermore, in every city very few men train their bodies, but among my mercenaries no one serves unless he is able to endure as severe toils as I myself.

Jason's military strategy was closely tied to his political aims within Thessaly. Polydamas of Pharsalus, one of the statesman at that time suggested that Jason did not rely on intimidation, but thought to secure the connection of local aristocracies and major cities. He presented to them an unified Thessaly under his leadership, and arguing that a strong common army and a recognized tagus would protect local interests from internal rivalry and foreign intervention.

There was a very realistic threat posed by Jason to his neighbours and arguably to all of Hellas. However, it has also been argued by Yalichev that the Thessalian showed signs of pan-Hellenism in his approach to the prominent poleis of the south, an attitude exemplified particularly in his warning to Thebes not to destroy Sparta after the Battle of Leuctra. Whether or not Jason had ambitions to rule over the entire Greek peninsula—as Philip II would after Chaeronea—can only be left to speculation. Regardless, Jason epitomises how one autocrat could suddenly rise to power through mercenary employment and threaten, both politically and militarily, his neighbouring poleis.

Jason's foreign policy combined this military and naval power with an active diplomacy. He gathered relations with the Molossian kingdom in Epirus and with the Macedonian court, and he appears in some traditions as a friendly visitor to Athens, where he was supportive towards admiral Timotheus during a public trial. He formally entered the Second Athenian League, and Athenians regarded him as a valuable ally at the same time as he was building an independent base of power in Thessaly.

His key Strengths shows the strategic dimensions of his rule. After his intervention in central Greece, he is reported to have destroyed the fortifications of Heraclea in Trachis, near the northern entrance to Thermoplylae, to prevent any rival power from using the city to blocking his movements. Later authors talk about Jason and his circle with developments in tactics and equipment, such as the half-cuirass (hemithorakion) by officers.

== Death ==
Jason was assassinated in 370 BC by a group of unidentified young men. Xenophon suggests the assassination may have been motivated by fear over Jason's perceived desire to take over control of the Oracle of Delphi following the Pythian Games. According to Xenophon, when the people of Delphi asked the oracle what they should do, the reply was that Apollo could take care of his own shrine (Hellenika 6.4.30). Diodorus Siculus, however, records that Jason's assassination was motivated either by the desire for fame or on the orders of his brother Polydorus (15.60.5).

Eventually Alexander, possibly his son, inherited the title of tagus and ruled harshly before finally being defeated by the Thebans.

Xenophon wrote of Jason:

His generalship is of the highest quality—he is one who whether his methods are those of plain force, or working in the dark, or of seizing an unexpected advantage, very seldom fails to achieve his objects. He can use the night-time as well as the day time, and when he wants to move fast, he will put breakfast and dinner into one meal, so as not to interrupt his work. He will not think it right to rest until he has reached the point for which he set out and done all that had to be done. And he has trained his men to behave in the same way, although he knows how to gratify the feelings of his soldiers when they have won some success as the results of extra hard work. So all who follow him have learned this too—that one can have a good time also, if one works for it. Then, too, he is more self controlled than any man I know with regard to bodily pleasures. These never take up his time and prevent him from doing what has to be done.

The inventor of hemithorakion (half-armour equipment) is believed to be Jason of Pherae

== Historical significance ==
Jason of Pherae was a potentially major figure in Greek history whose potential remained unrealized because of his early death. It is clear that he intended to create a regional empire in northern and eastern Hellas similar to the empire Dionysius I created in Sicily, and his career before it was cut short by assassins indicated that he had the talent and resources to do so. If he had lived longer, his empire might have assumed the dominant influence in Greece which shortly afterwards was achieved by Macedonia.

== Related Figures ==
- Lycophron of Pherae: Jason's predecessor (maybe his father). He was the earlier tyrant of Pherae whose aggressive style creates a power base, but also instability in Pherae.
- Polydamas of Pharsalus: He is one of the leading aristocrat from Pharsalus, one of the most important cities in Thessaly.
- Amyntas III of Macedon: King of Macedon (father of Philip II), and he was an ally for Jason or at least friendly partner in the north.
- Alcetas I of Epirus: He is the Molossian king in Epirus. Jason appears in Athens for the trail of Timotheus, and hes influence reaching west into Epirus and south into Athens.
- Timotheus (Athenian admiral): Athenian general and admiral, active in the Second Athenian League. Jason was supporting him during a trial in Athens, and this shows Jason being treated as a respected ally in a democratic city, not just a distant tyrant.

== See also ==
- Pherae
- Thessaly
