= Farsala =

Town in Thessaly, Greece

Farsala Φάρσαλος
- Municipality
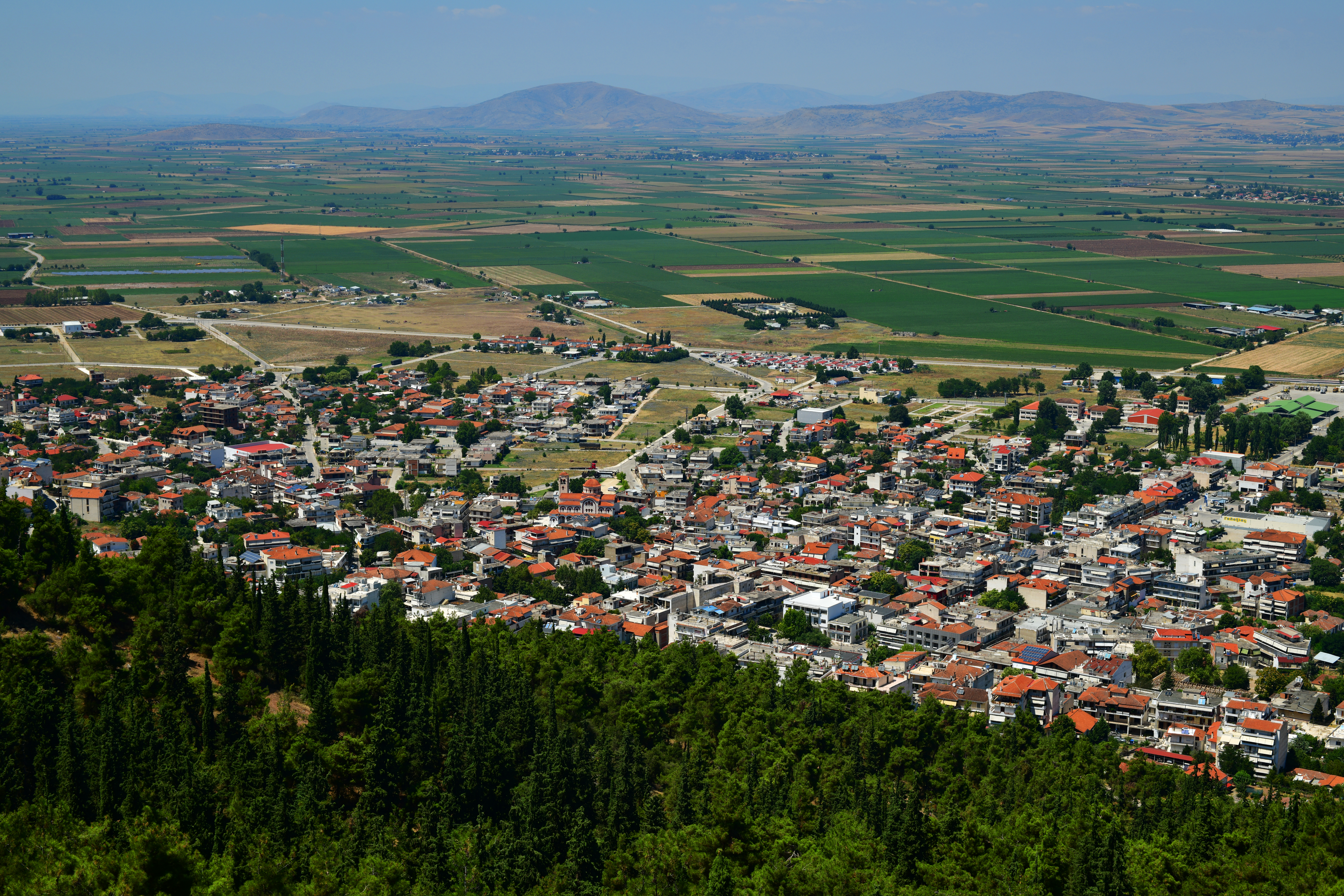
- View of Farsala from the Ancient Pharsalus Acropolis

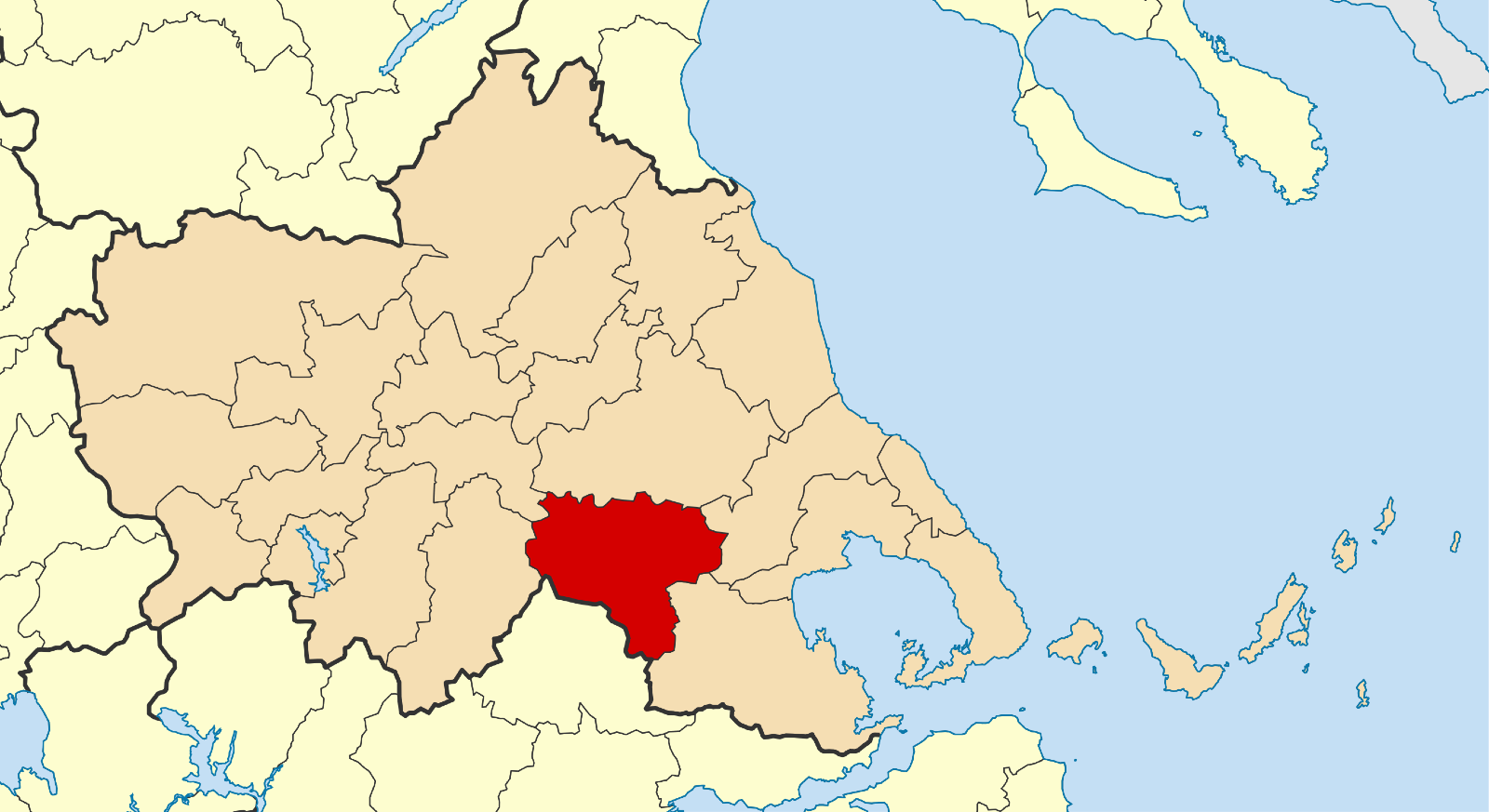

- Location within Greece
- Coordinates: 39°18′N 22°23′E
- Country: Greece
- Administrative region: Thessaly
- Regional unit: Larissa

Area
  - Municipality: 739.7 km^{2} (285.6 sq mi)
  - Municipal unit: 121.433 km^{2} (46.886 sq mi)
  - Community: 57.928 km^{2} (22.366 sq mi)
- Elevation: 160 m (520 ft)

Population (2021)
  - Municipality: 16,341
  - Density: 22.09/km^{2} (57.22/sq mi)
  - Municipal unit: 9,520
  - Municipal unit density: 78.4/km^{2} (203/sq mi)
  - Community: 9,027
  - Community density: 155.8/km^{2} (403.6/sq mi)
- Time zone: UTC+2 (EET)
  - Summer (DST): UTC+3 (EEST)
- Postal code: 403 00
- Area code: 24910
- Vehicle registration: ΡΙ
- Website: www.farsala.gr

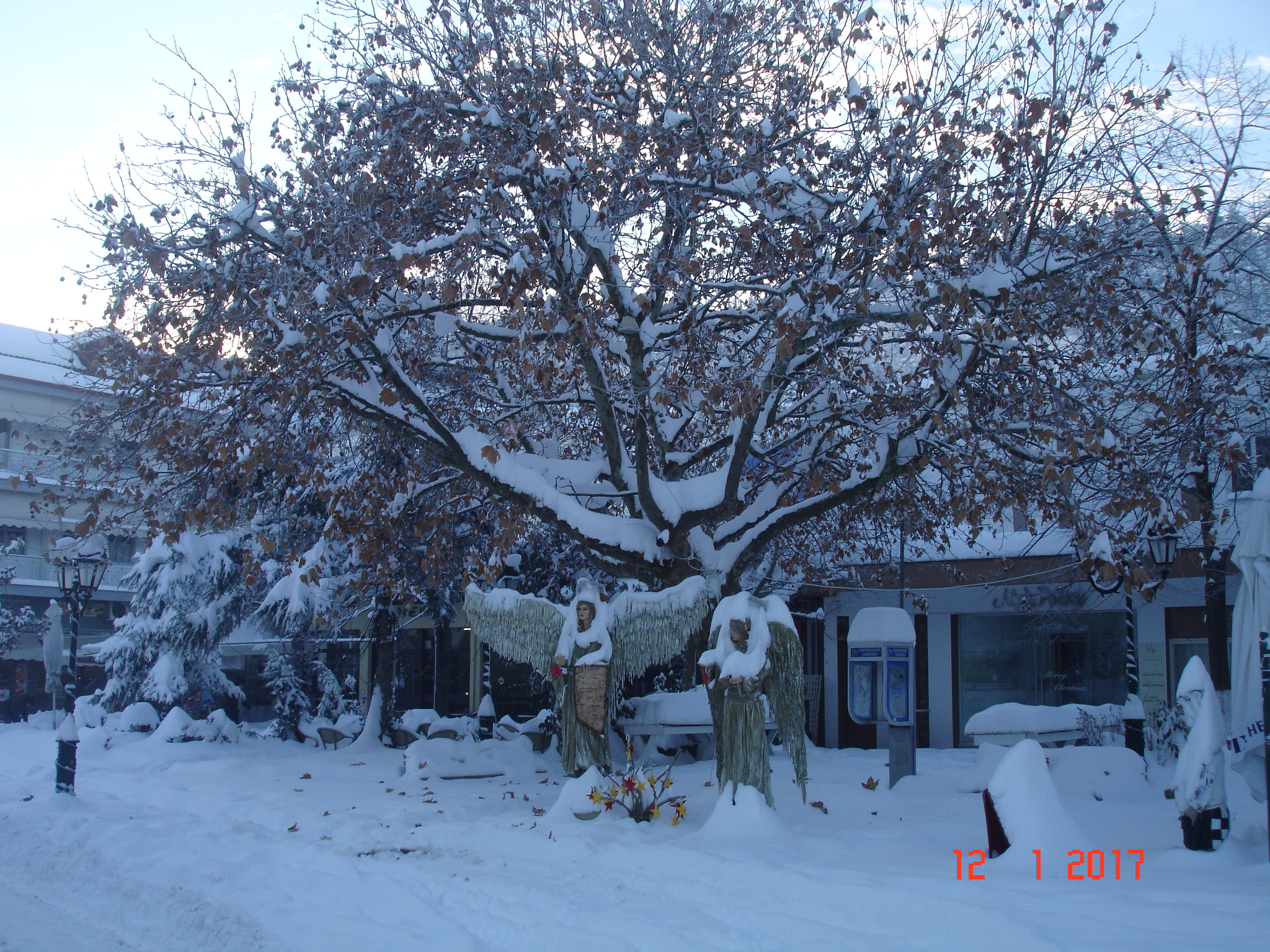
People's square

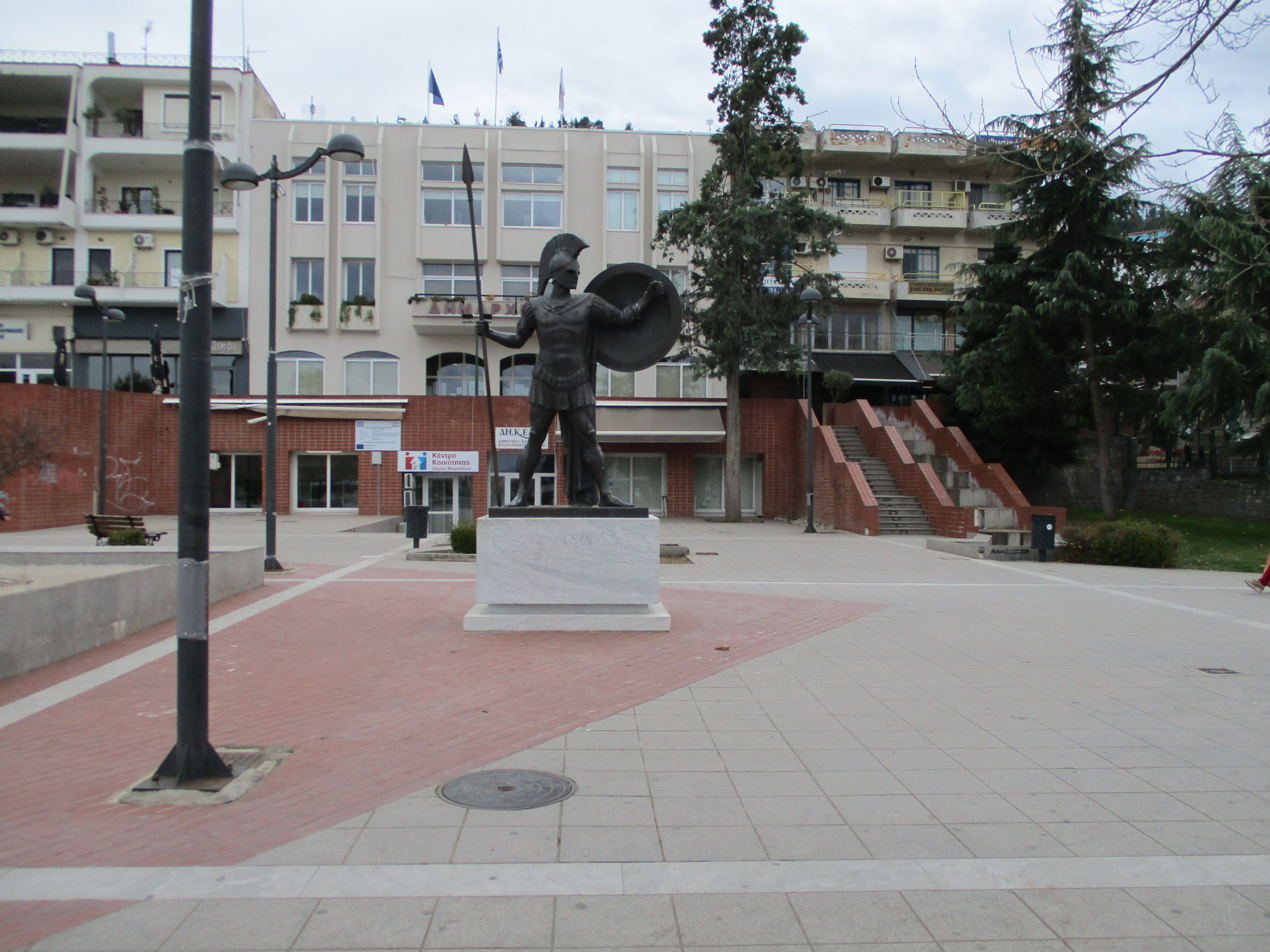
Statue of Achilles in the main square

Farsala (Greek: Φάρσαλα), known in Antiquity as Pharsalos (Ancient Greek: Φάρσαλος, Latin: Pharsālus), is a town in southern Thessaly, in Greece. Farsala is located in the southern part of Larissa regional unit, and is one of its largest settlements. Farsala is an economic and agricultural centre of the region. Cotton and livestock are the main agricultural products, and many inhabitants are employed in the production of textile. The area is mostly famous for being the birthplace of the mythical ancient Greek hero Achilles, and the site of a major battle between Roman generals Gaius Julius Caesar and Gnaeus Pompeius Magnus in 48 BC.

== Geography ==
Farsala lies at the southern edge of the Thessalian Plain, 4 km south of the river Enipeas. The Greek National Road 3 (Larissa - Lamia) and the Greek National Road 30 (Karditsa - Volos) pass through the town. The Palaiofarsalos railway station (litt. "Ancient Pharsalus"), on the line from Athens to Thessaloniki and head of the branch line to Kalambaka, is located in the village of Stavros, 12 km to the west. Farsala is located 38 km south of Larissa, 41 km east of Karditsa, 44 km north of Lamia and 49 km west of Volos.

The municipality Farsala has an area of 739.74 km^{2}, the municipal unit Farsala has an area of 121.433 km^{2}, and the community Farsala has an area of 57.928 km^{2}.

== History ==
=== Ancient Pharsalos ===
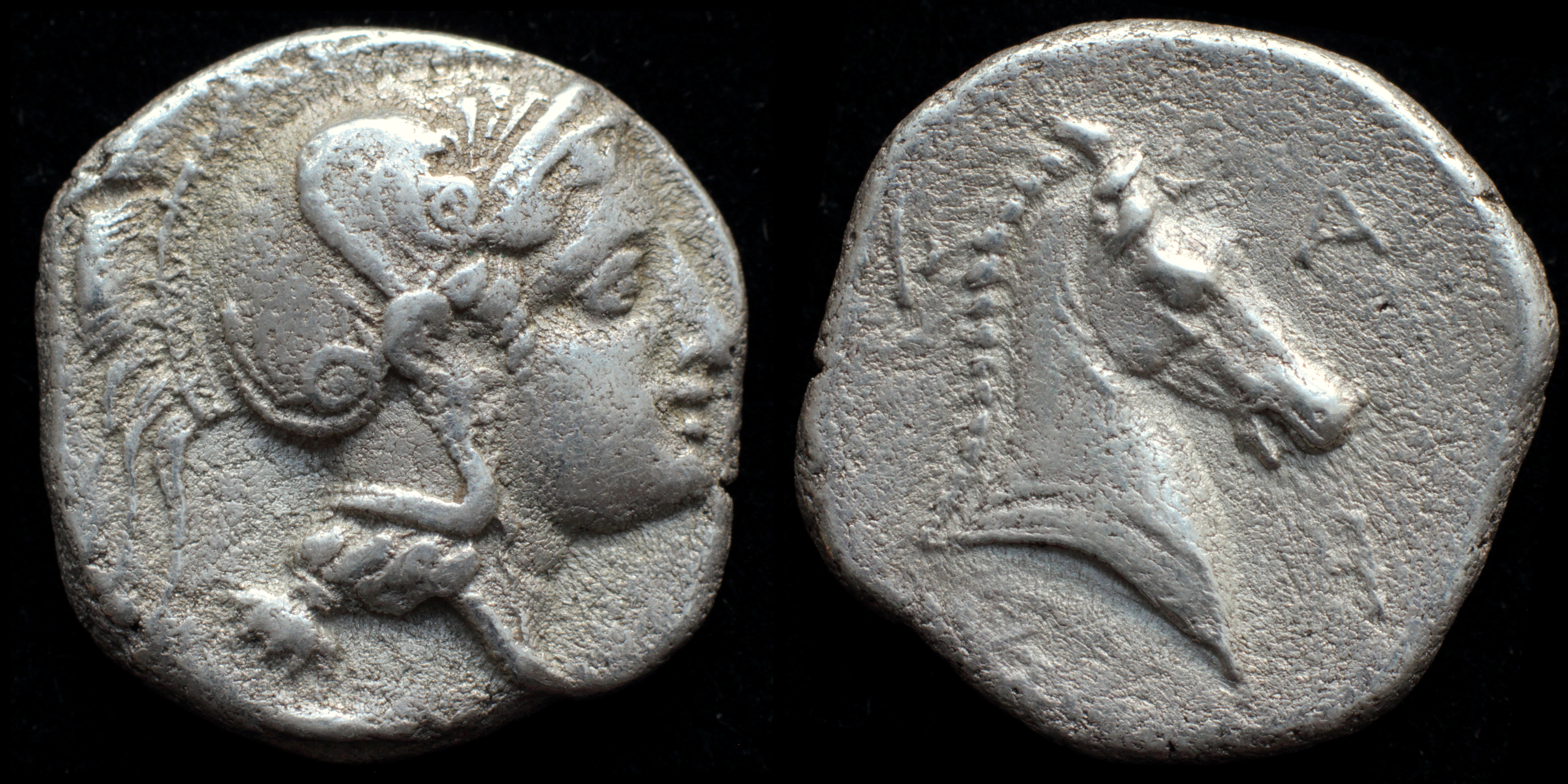

First side of the image: O: helmeted head of Athena
Second side of the image: R: head of horse Φ A / P Σ
silver hemidrachm struck in Pharsalos 450-400 BC.

==== Proto-historic era ====
The Homeric Phthia of the Mycenaean period, capital of the Kingdom of the Myrmidons and of Peleus, father of Achilles, has sometimes been identified with the later city of Pharsalos (Greek: Φάρσαλος), now Farsala. A Cyclopean Wall which protected a city still exists today near modern Farsala, as does a vaulted tomb from that period.

There is a theory that claimed the existence of an earlier Pharsalos in the form of a locality identified as Palaepharsalus. This is supported by excavated remains of a fortified site called Xylades near Enipeus, which is located in the easternmost part of the Pharsalian territory. This ancient site was also associated by accounts of ancient writers with a holy place dedicated to Thetis called Thetidium. For instance, Euripides used this as a setting for Andromache.

==== Archaic era ====
The Pharsalos of the historic era was built over a hillside of the Narthacius mountains at an elevation of some 160 m, where modern Farsala stands. It was one of the main cities in Thessaly and was the capital of the Phthian tetrarch. It was also a polis (city-state).

==== Classical era ====
In the Persian Wars it sided with the Athenians. A distinctive tribe of the city was that of Echecratidon. In 455 BC Pharsalos was besieged by the Athenian commander Myronides, after his victory in Boeotia, but without success. At the commencement of the Peloponnesian War, Pharsalus was one of the Thessalian towns that sent succour to the Athenians. Medius of Larissa took Pharsalus by force, about 395 BC. Pharsalus, under the conduct of Polydamas, resisted Jason of Pherae for a time, but subsequently formed an alliance with him.

In the early 4th century BC, the city was a part of the Thessalian Commons. Later, it joined the Macedonian Kingdom under Philip II. The area became a theatre of war where the Aetolians and the Thessalians clashed with the Macedonians, especially during the Second and the Third Macedonian Wars.

The city during the classical period was influential as demonstrated in the influence wielded by the tetrarch Daochos, who ruled from Pharsalos. He was part of the Council of Amphictyonic League, administered the Temple of Apollo at Delphi, and conducted the Pythian Games. Daochos built several monuments at Pharsalos dedicated to members of his family. Parts of the eight portraits that survived showed classical style, depicting subjects in their youthful vigor.

==== Hellenistic era ====
In the war between Antiochus III and the Romans, Pharsalus was for a time in the possession of the Syrian monarch; but on the retreat of the latter, it surrendered to the consul Acilius Glabrio in 191 BC.

==== Roman era ====
After the defeat of the Macedonian Kingdom, Pharsalos and the whole area became a part of the Roman Republic.

The whole area suffered great destruction during the Roman Civil War. The Battle of Pharsalus, where Julius Caesar defeated Pompey and changed the course of the Roman Republic forever, took place in 48 BC in the fields of the Pharsalian Plain.

The geographer Strabo speaks of two towns, Old Pharsalos, Παλαιοφάρσαλος (Palaeopharsalos) and Pharsalos, existing in historical times. His statement (9.5.6) that the Thetideion, the temple to Thetis south of Scotussa, was “near both the Pharsaloi, the Old and the New”, seems to imply that Palaeopharsalos was not itself close by Pharsalos. Although the battle of 48 BC is called after Pharsalos, four ancient writers – the author of the Bellum Alexandrinum (48.1), Frontinus (Strategemata 2.3.22), Eutropius (20), and Orosius (6.15.27) – place it specifically at Palaeopharsalos. In 198 BC Philip V had sacked Palaeopharsalos (Livy 32.13.9). If that town had been close to Pharsalos he would have sacked both, and Livy would have written “Pharsalus” instead of “Palaeopharsalus”. The British scholar F. L. Lucas demonstrated (Annual of the British School at Athens, No. XXIV, 1919–21) that the battle of 48 BC must have been fought north of the Enipeus, near modern-day Krini. It has been suggested that Krini was built on the site of Palaeopharsalos, where the old road south from Larissa emerged from the hills on to the Pharsalian Plain.

In the time of Pliny the Elder, Pharsalus was a free state. It is also mentioned by Hierocles in the sixth century.

=== Modern Farsala ===
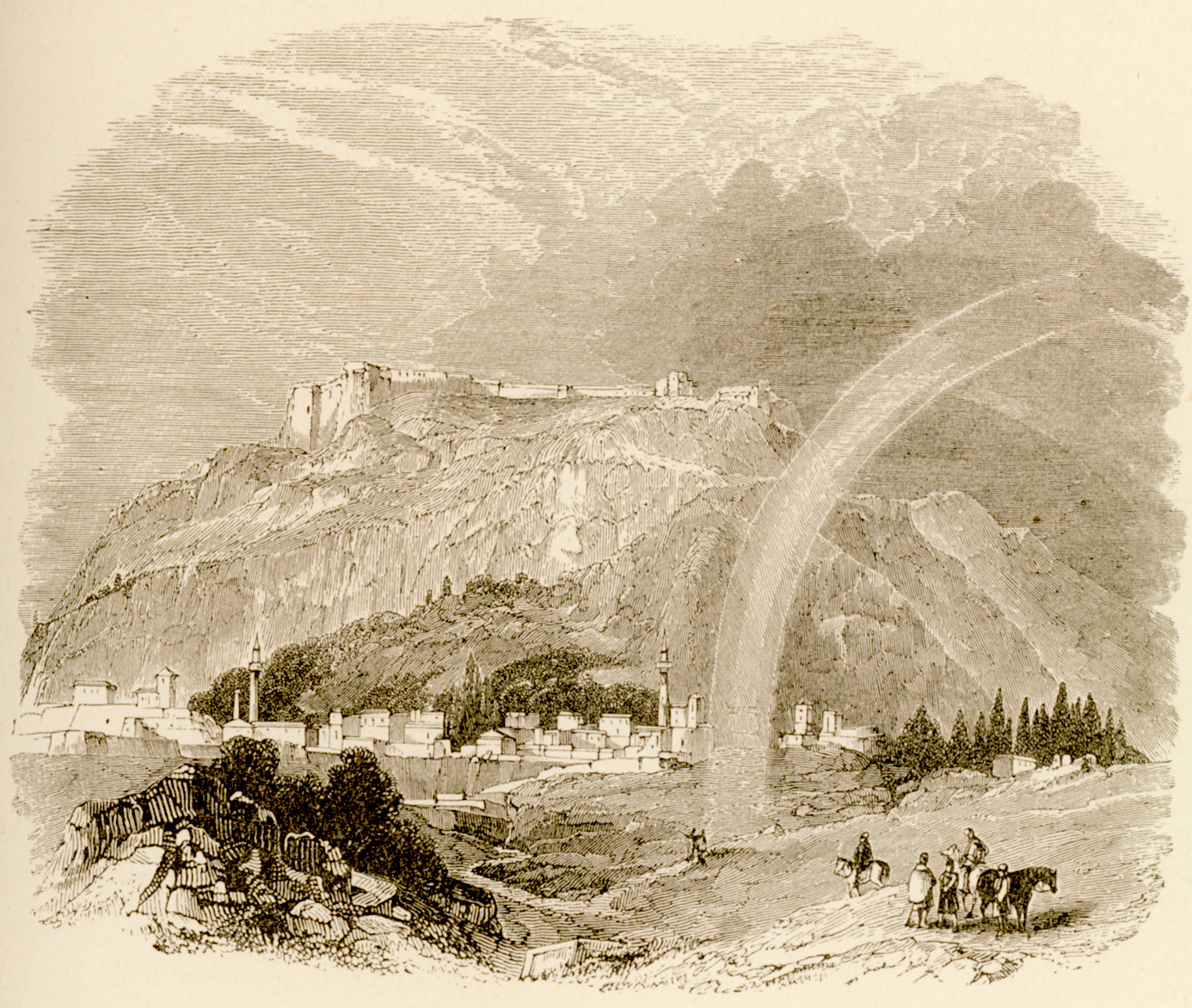
Farsala in the 19th century

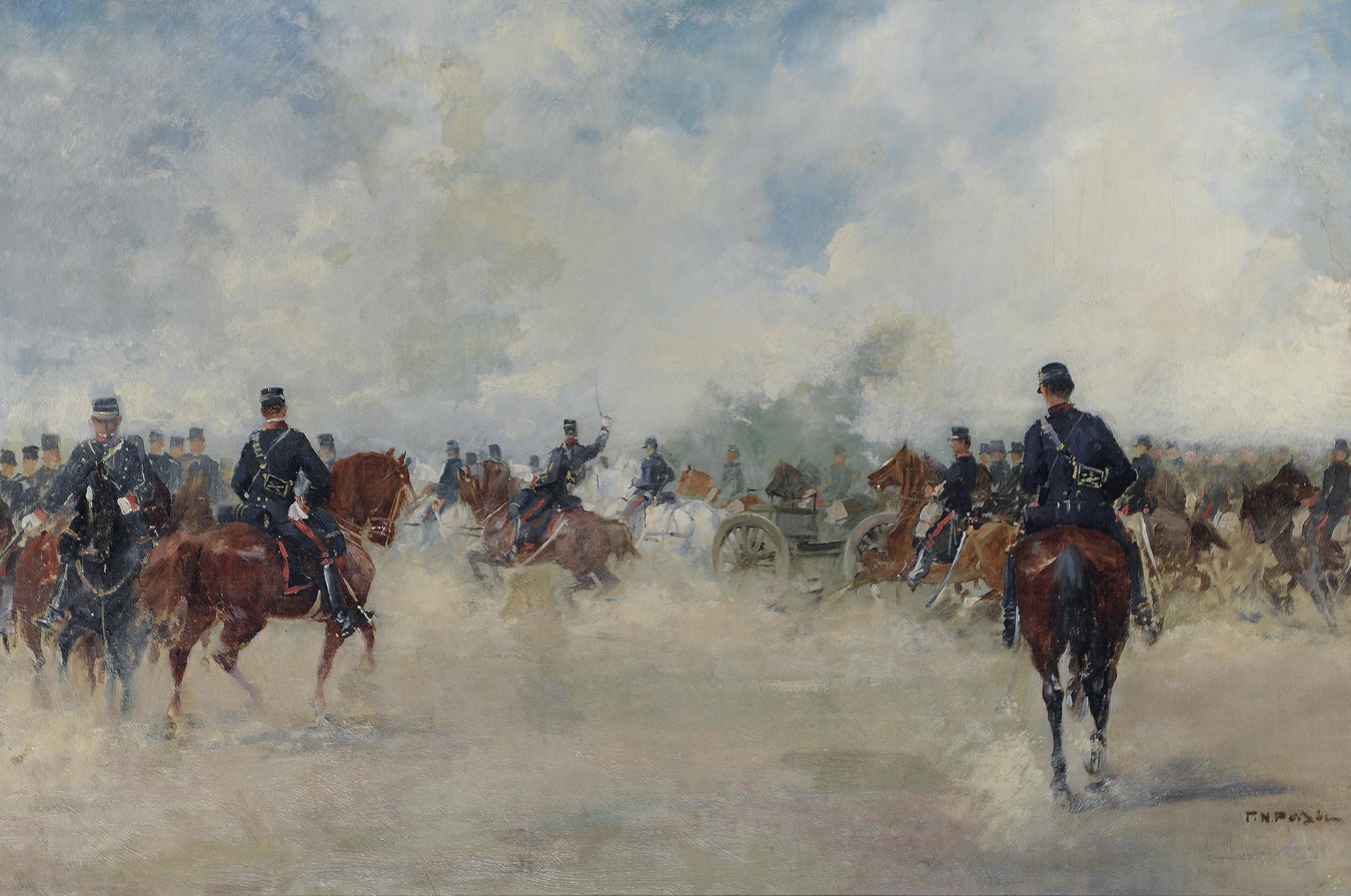
The Battle of Farsala by Georgios Roilos (1867–1928).

Farsala was known as Çatalca during Ottoman rule.

Following the Treaty of Berlin the city became part of the Hellenic Kingdom together with the rest of Thessaly in 1881. During the First Greco-Turkish War (1897), a major battle took place in the vicinity of Farsala.

The contemporary town has no historical or medieval buildings left as a result of a World War II bombardment and a catastrophic earthquake that struck the area in 1954. Small scale urbanization processes attracted population from surrounding villages during the 80's and 90's creating an urban landscape typical of Greek cities with small apartment buildings in nearby plots of land.

== Municipality ==
The municipality Farsala was formed at the 2011 local government reform by the merger of the following 4 former municipalities, that became municipal units:

- Enippeas
- Farsala
- Narthaki
- Polydamantas

== Province ==
The province of Farsala (Greek: Επαρχία Φαρσάλων) was one of the provinces of the Larissa Prefecture. It had the same territory as the present municipality. It was abolished in 2006.

== Historical population ==
Year	Town	Municipal unit	Municipality
1981	7,211	-	-
1991	8,457	9,464	-
2001	9,801	10,812	-
2011	9,337	9,982	18,545
2021	9,027	9,520	16,341

== See also ==
- Battle of Pharsalus (48 BC)
- Battle of Pharsalus (1277)
- Battle of Pharsalus (1897)
- List of settlements in the Larissa regional unit
