= Tagus (title) =

Thessalian chief magistrate in antiquity

Tagus (Ancient Greek: τᾱγός, τάγης) was a Thessalian title for a leader or general, especially the military leader of the Thessalian League. When occasion required, a chief magistrate was elected under the name of Tagus, whose commands were obeyed by all the four districts of Thessaly (Phthiotis, Thessaliotis, Histiaeotis, Pelasgiotis). He is sometimes called king ("basileus", Herodotus, V.63), and sometimes "archon" (Dionysius. V.74).

Accordingly, Pollux (I.128), in his list of military designations, classes together the Boeotarchs of the Thebans, the Kings of Sparta, the Polemarchs of the Athenians, (in reference to their original duties), and the Tagoi of the Thessalians. When Jason of Pherae was Tagus, he had an army of more than 8,000 cavalry and not less than 20,000 hoplites. When Thessaly was not united under a Tagus, the subject towns possessed more independence. Philip II of Macedon and his son Alexander the Great exercised control over Thessaly as elected Tagoi. In later times some states called their ordinary magistrates "Tagoi".
