= Pherae =

Ancient Greek city-state in Thessaly

Coordinates: 39°23′03″N 22°44′16″E

Map showing ancient Thessaly. Pherae is shown to the east centre.

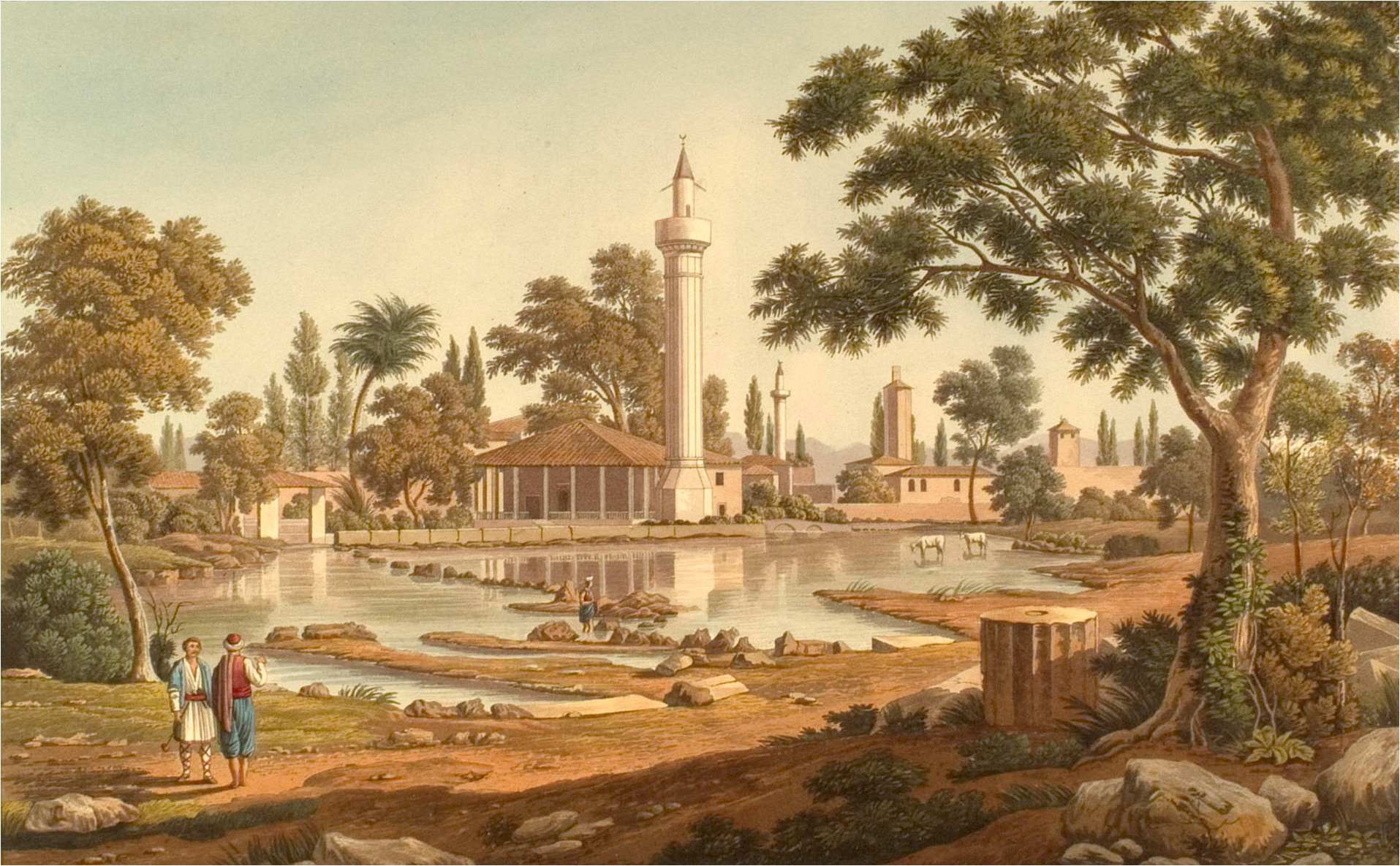
The Hyperian Fountain at Pherae, with Ottoman mosques, Edward Dodwell.

Pherae (Greek: Φεραί) was a city and polis (city-state) in southeastern Ancient Thessaly. One of the oldest Thessalian cities, it was located in the southeast corner of Pelasgiotis. According to Strabo, it was near Lake Boebeïs 90 stadia from Pagasae, its harbor on the Gulf of Pagasae (Geography 9.5). The site is in the modern community of Velestino.

In Homer Pherae was the home of King Admetus and his wife, Alcestis, (whom Heracles went into Hades to rescue), as well as their son Eumelus (who was one of the suitors of Helen and led the Achaean forces of Pherae and Iolcus in the Trojan War) (Iliad 2.711; Odyssey 4.798).

Thucydides lists Pherae among the early Thessalian supporters of Athens at the beginning of the Peloponnesian War (History of the Peloponnesian War 2.22). Toward the end of the war Lycophron established a tyranny at Pherae. On his death his son Jason became dictator and by around 374 BC extended his rule throughout Thessaly. After Jason's assassination and that of his successor, Polydorus, Alexander ruled Pherae with great harshness until he was killed by his wife, Thebe, in 359 BC, and Thessaly was conquered by the Thebans. Philip of Macedon conquered Pherae in 352 BC and subjected Thessaly to Macedonian rule.

In Roman times Pherae was conquered by Antiochus the Great of Syria in 191 BC, but lost it that same year to the Roman consul of the year Manius Acilius Glabrio (Livy 36.1-14). The famous Messeis spring (the spring of Kefalovryso at Velestino) was probably at Pherae (Strabo, Geography 9.5; Iliad 6.457).

== See also ==
- List of ancient Greek cities
- Modern Feres, Magnesia
- Pharae (Messenia), the modern Kalamata
- Pharae, in Achaea
