= Cleonaeus =

Ancient military commander from Rhodes

Cleonaeus (Ancient Greek: Κλεωναῖος) was a Rhodian admiral. He was second-in-command to Theophiliscus at the Battle of Chios, and he became commander after a victorious Theophilscius died from the wounds that he received during the battle. As Cleonaeus was sailing back to Rhodes, he was defeated by Philip V of Macedon at the Battle of Lade.
