= Bottyán =

Bottyán (or Battyán) may refer to:

== Places ==
- Őrbottyán, a town in Hungary
- Ivánbattyán, a village in Hungary
- Szabadbattyán, a village in Hungary
- Battyán, the Hungarian name of Boťany, Slovakia
- Bottyánfalva, the Hungarian name of Bârna, Botinești, Romania
- Batthyány tér, an urban square in Budapest, Hungary
- Batthyány tér (Budapest Metro), a metro station in Budapest, Hungary

== Other uses ==
- Batthyány, a Hungarian noble family, including a list of people with the name
- János Bottyán (1643–1709), Hungarian general

== See also ==
- Battyánd, the Hungarian name of Puconci, Prekmurje, Slovenia
- Battyna, an ancient town in Orestis, Upper Macedonia
