= Zone (colony) =

Coordinates: 40°51′20″N 25°44′45″E

Zone (Ancient Greek: Ζώνη) was an ancient Greek polis on the Aegean coast of ancient Thrace on a promontory of the same name, a short distance to the west of the entrance of the Lacus Stentoris.

According to Apollonius of Rhodes and Mela, it was to this place that the woods followed Orpheus, when set in motion by his wondrous music.

Herodotus says that it was – together with Sale - one of the cities near the promontory or Serreion, currently named Cape Makri, on whose beaches the ships of the Persian army of Xerxes landed so that their crews could rest at Doriscus, and Xerxes proceeded to count his army at the beginning of the expedition of the year 480 BCE against Greece. In the Periplus of Pseudo-Scylax, Zone and Drys are mentioned as neighboring cities of Maroneia, Diceaa, and Abdera but located in the interior, although Zone was close to the island of Samothrace. The city must have belonged to the Delian League since it appears in an Athenian decree of the year 422/1 BCE.

Although it was thought that its location was in the modern town of Makri, several recent archaeological finds support the identification of Zone with a site at the mouth of the river Shabla Dere, a place that was previously identified with the old Mesembria. These findings include, among others, a sanctuary of Apollo of the Archaic Period and numerous coins, in which the head of Apollo is represented and the allusion to the name of the city in the forms ΖΩΝΑΙΩΝ, ΖΩΝΑΙ, ΖΩΝ or ΖΩ.

The excavations at the sanctuary revealed over 200 graffiti and short inscriptions inscribed onto pottery fragments (potsherds) dating to the 6th and early 5th centuries BC. In 2006, Claude Brixhe concluded that the inscriptions are in the Thracian language, constituting the first available corpus of sentences for the study of this language. Prior to this discovery, the understanding of Thracian was built on a corpus of personal names (onomastics), place names, and a few famous, deeply obscure inscriptions found deeper in the Balkan interior.

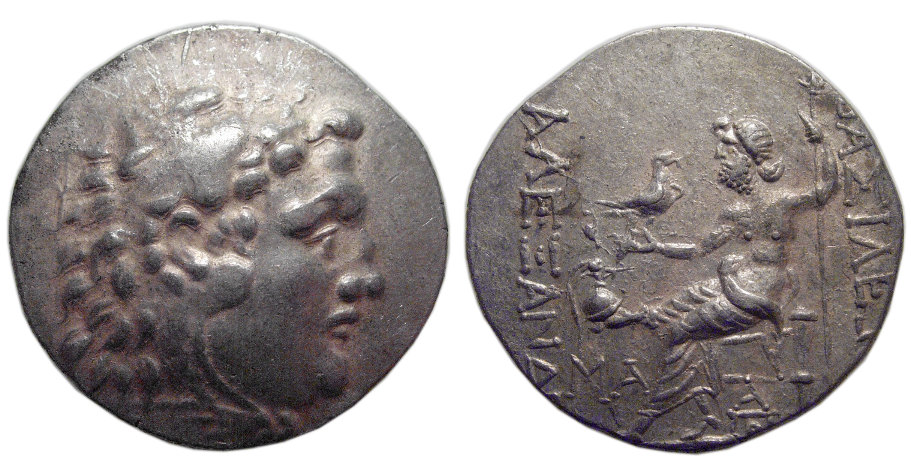
Alexander the Great Tetradrachm from the Messembria Mint, c. 175-125 BC

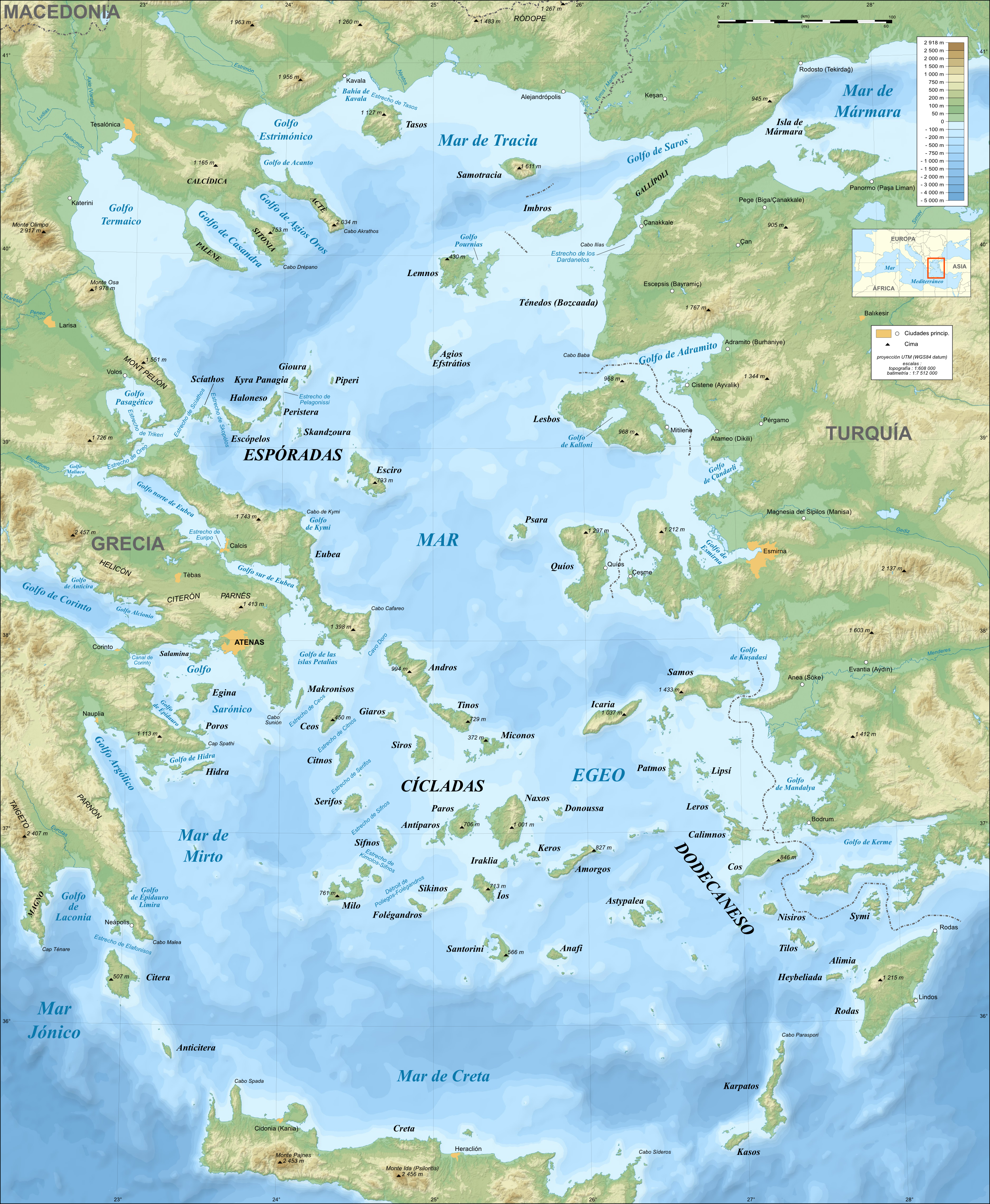
Bathymetry map of the Aegean Sea

== See also ==
- List of Greek colonies in Thrace
- Tetradrachm

== External sources ==
- Zone at Livius.org
