= Boğaziçi, Milas =

Boğaziçi
- Neighbourhood
- Location in Turkey Boğaziçi (Turkey Aegean)
- Coordinates: 37.2000°N 27.5755°E
- Country: Turkey
- Province: Muğla
- District: Milas
- Population (2022): 3,336
- Time zone: UTC+3 (TRT)

Boğaziçi is a neighbourhood of the municipality and district of Milas, Muğla Province, Turkey. Its population is 3,336 (2022). It is a working fishing village on the shore of Lake Tuzla. Today a number of fish restaurants line the shoreline. Boğaziçi contains several derelict structures such as Club Mandalya, and abandoned cottages.

In ancient times this was the site of the ancient Carian city of Bargylia. Bargylia was said to have been founded by Bellerophon in honour of his companion Bargylus, who had been killed by a kick from Pegasus. Ruins of the ancient city of Bargylia, including a Roman temple can be seen scattered around the locality.

Boğaziçi is located only 10 minutes from Milas–Bodrum Airport and is home to the resort of Lakeside Garden which is the base for bird watchers who descend on the area to see greater flamingos flock to the protected Lake Tuzla during the winter months.
