= Battle of Lade (201 BC) =

Battle fought between Rhodes and Macedon in 201 BC

Coordinates: 37.530233°N 27.278369°E

Battle of Lade (201)
- Part of the Cretan War
- Location of Lade Island and Miletus at Maeander River's mouth.
Date	201 BC
Location	Lade off the shore of Miletus (modern-day Turkey)
Result	Macedonian victory

Belligerents
Macedon	Rhodes

Commanders and leaders
Philip V of Macedon	Cleonaeus of Rhodes

The Battle of Lade was fought between the navy of Rhodes and the navy of Macedon. The battle took place in 201 BC as part of the Cretan War, which lasted from 205 to 200 BC. The battle was a continuation of hostilities from the Battle of Chios (201 BC) (Mommsen, Bk III, CH VIII).

The battle, fought off the shore of Asia Minor and the island of Lade, near Miletus, ended in a victory for the Macedonians. As the Rhodian fleet was sailing in the strait between Lade and Miletus, Philip's fleet attacked them. Philip defeated the Rhodian fleet and forced it to retreat back to Rhodes.
