= Roman war elephants =

History of the use of elephants in war by and against the ancient Romans

Due to the Roman focus on infantry and its discipline, war elephants were rarely used. While the Romans did eventually adopt them, and used them occasionally after the Punic Wars, especially during the conquest of Greece, they fell out of use by the time of Claudius, after which they were generally used for the purpose of demoralizing enemies instead of being used for tactical purposes. The Romans occasionally used them for transport.

== History ==
=== History of elephants and Rome ===
Although the use of war elephants in the Mediterranean is most famously associated with the wars between Carthage and Rome, the introduction of war elephants was primarily the result of the Greek kingdom of Epirus. King Pyrrhus of Epirus brought twenty elephants to attack the Romans at the battle of Heraclea in 280 BC, leaving some fifty additional animals, on loan from Pharaoh Ptolemy II, on the mainland. The Romans were unprepared for fighting elephants, and the Epirot forces routed the Romans. The next year, the Epirots again deployed a similar force of elephants, attacking the Romans at the battle of Asculum. This time the Romans came prepared with flammable weapons and anti-elephant devices: these were ox-drawn wagons, equipped with long spikes to wound the elephants, pots of fire to scare them, and accompanying screening troops who would hurl javelins at the elephants to drive them away. A final charge of Epirot elephants won the day again, but this time Pyrrhus had suffered very heavy casualties—a Pyrrhic victory.

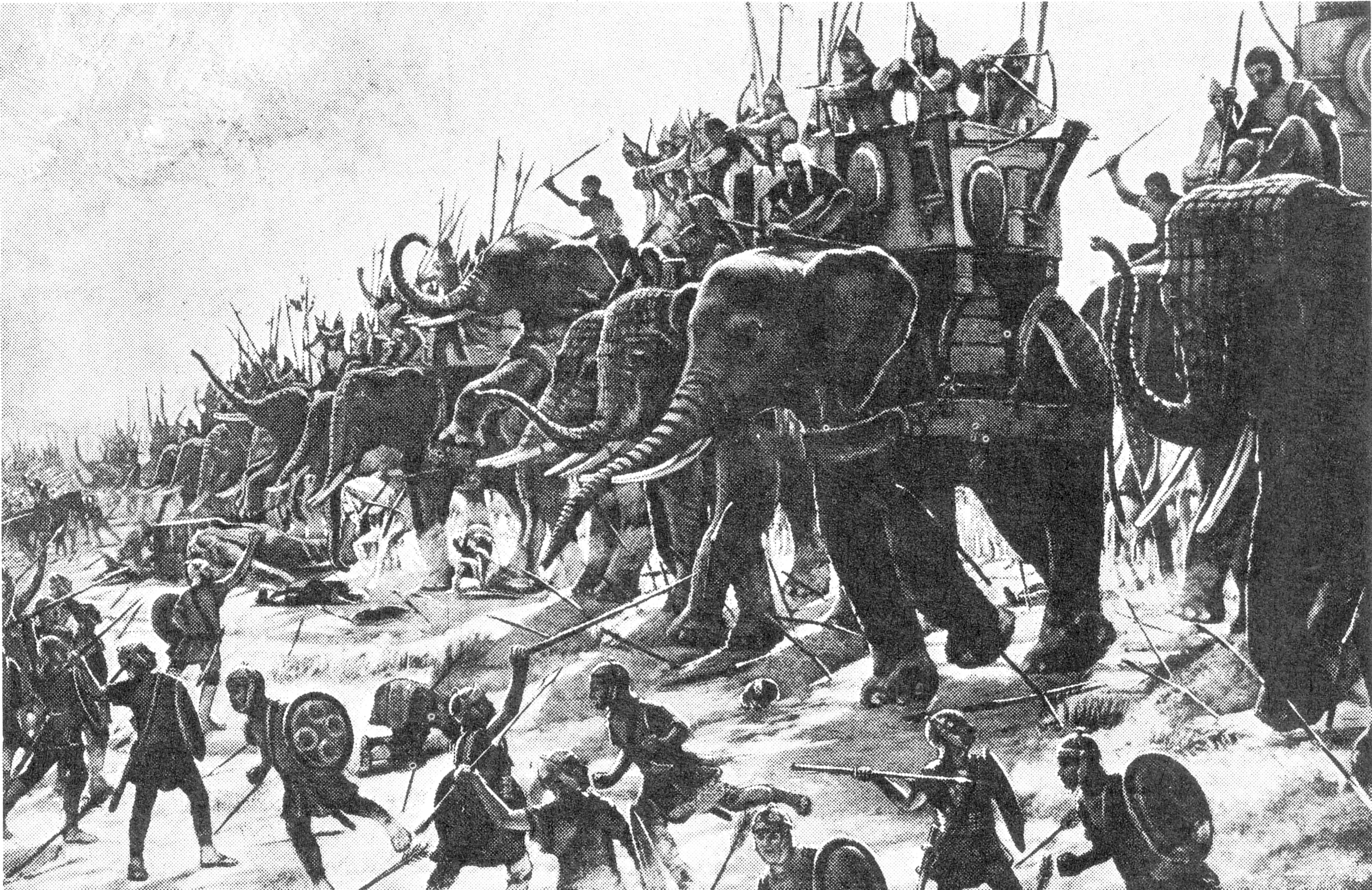
Battle of Zama by Henri-Paul Motte, 1890

Perhaps inspired by these victories, Carthage developed its own use of war elephants and deployed them extensively during the First and Second Punic Wars. The performance of the Carthaginian elephant corps was rather mixed, illustrating the need of proper tactics to take advantage of the elephant's strength and cover its weaknesses. At Adyss in 255 BC, the Carthaginian elephants were ineffective due to the terrain, while at the battle of Panormus in 251 BC the Romans' velites were able to terrify the Carthaginian elephants being used unsupported, which fled from the field. At the battle of Tunis however the charge of the Carthaginian elephants helped to disorder the legions, allowing the Carthaginian phalanx to stand fast and defeat the Romans. During the Second Punic War, Hannibal famously led an army of war elephants across the Alps—although many of them perished in the harsh conditions. The surviving elephants were successfully used in the battle of Trebia, where they panicked the Roman cavalry and Gallic allies. The Romans eventually developed effective anti-elephant tactics, leading to Hannibal's defeat at his final battle of Zama in 202 BC; his elephant charge, unlike the one at the battle of Tunis, was ineffective because the disciplined Roman maniples simply made way for them to pass.

=== History of Roman use ===
Elephants captured in 275 BC, after the end of the Pyrrhic War, were displayed in a triumph. Later, Rome brought back many elephants at the end of the Punic Wars, and used them in its campaigns for many years afterwards. The conquest of Greece saw many battles in which the Romans deployed war elephants, including the invasion of Macedonia in 199 BC, the battle of Cynoscephalae 197 BC, the battle of Thermopylae, and the battle of Magnesia in 190 BC, during which Antiochus III's fifty-four elephants took on the Roman force of sixteen. In later years the Romans deployed twenty-two elephants at Pydna in 168 BC. The role of the elephant force at Cynoscephalae was particularly decisive, as their quick charge shattered the unformed Macedonian left wing, allowing the Romans to encircle and destroy the victorious Macedonian right. A similar event also transpired at Pydna.

They also featured throughout the Roman campaign against the Celtiberians in Hispania. During the Second Celtiberian War, Quintus Fulvius Nobilior was helped by ten elephants sent by king Masinissa of Numidia. He deployed them against the Celtiberian forces of Numantia, but a falling stone hit one of the elephants, which panicked and frightened the rest, turning them against the Roman forces. After the subsequent Celtiberian counterattack, the Romans were forced to withdraw. Later, Quintus Fabius Maximus Servilianus marched against Viriathus with other ten elephants sent by king Micipsa. However, the Lusitanian style of ambushes in narrow terrains ensured his elephants did not play an important factor in the conflict, and Servilianus was eventually defeated by Viriathus in the city of Erisana.

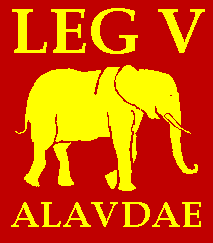
Reconstructed signum of Legio V Alaudae

The Romans supposedly used war elephant in the invasion of Britain. Polyaenus reports that during the Julius Caesar's invasion of Britain in 55 BC "Caesar had one large elephant, which was equipped with armor and carried archers and slingers in its tower. When this unknown creature entered the river, the Britons and their horses fled and the Roman army crossed over," However, this claim has been considered historically unreliable and probably untrue due to a lack of any other corroborating evidence from other sources, including Caesar's own writings. The claim by Cassius Dio, writing over 150 years after the events, that the emperor Claudius brought elephants to Britain during his invasion in 43 AD has also been doubted due to a lack of other sources mentioning the use of elephants, and logistical issues making their use in the campaign highly impractical. His use of the term "elephant" may actually refer to a kind of military machine, perhaps a siege tower.

At least one elephantine skeleton with flint weapons that has been found in England was initially misidentified as these elephants, but later dating proved it to be a mammoth skeleton from the Stone Age.

By the time of Claudius however, such animals were being used by the Romans in single numbers only—the last significant use of war elephants in the Mediterranean was against the Romans at the battle of Thapsus in 46 BC, in which 60 of them were used, where Julius Caesar armed his fifth legion (Alaudae) with axes and commanded his legionaries to strike at the elephant's legs. The legion withstood the charge, and the elephant became its symbol. Thapsus was the last significant use of elephants in the West. The remainder of the elephants seemed to have been thrown into panic by Caesar's archers and slingers.
