= Bargylus =

Mythical friend of Bellerophon

Bargylus (Ancient Greek: Βάργυλος) was a figure in ancient Greek mythology.

He was a friend of Bellerophon, who was killed by Bellerophon's horse, Pegasus. In commemoration of this, Bellerophon was said to have given a town in Caria the name Bargylia (modern Boğaziçi). We have today some ancient coins of Bargylia that feature Pegasus to commemorate this myth.
