= Nicanor (Macedonian general) =

Macedonian General (3rd century BC)

Nicanor (/naɪˈkeɪnər/; Greek: Nικάνωρ Nīkā́nōr), nicknamed "The Elephant", was a general under King Philip V of Macedonia in the 3rd century BC. He was one of the bravest generals of Philip.

He invaded Attica with an army shortly before the outbreak of the Second Macedonian War between Philip V and the Romans in 200 BC, but after having laid waste to part of the open country, he was induced to withdraw by the remonstrances of the Roman ambassadors then at Athens.

He is again mentioned as commanding the rearguard of Philip's army at the battle of Cynoscephalae in 197 BC, which the Romans won.
