= Sale (Thrace) =

Coordinates: 40°50′41″N 25°52′30″E

Sale (Ancient Greek: Σάλη, Sálē) was a Greek city located on the south coast of ancient Thrace, near the west mouth of the Hebrus, and nearly equidistant from Zone and Doriscus, thus between the river Nestos and the Hebrus.

Herodotus tells us that it was founded as a colony from Samothrace. While Livy wrote that during his time the city belonged to the Maroneia.

It was a member of the Delian League as its name appears in the tribute lists of Athens for 422/1 BCE.

Its site is located near modern Alexandropolis.

== See also ==
- Greek colonies in Thrace
