= Celetrum =

Town in Orestis, ancient Upper Macedonia

- Κέλετρον (Ancient Greek)
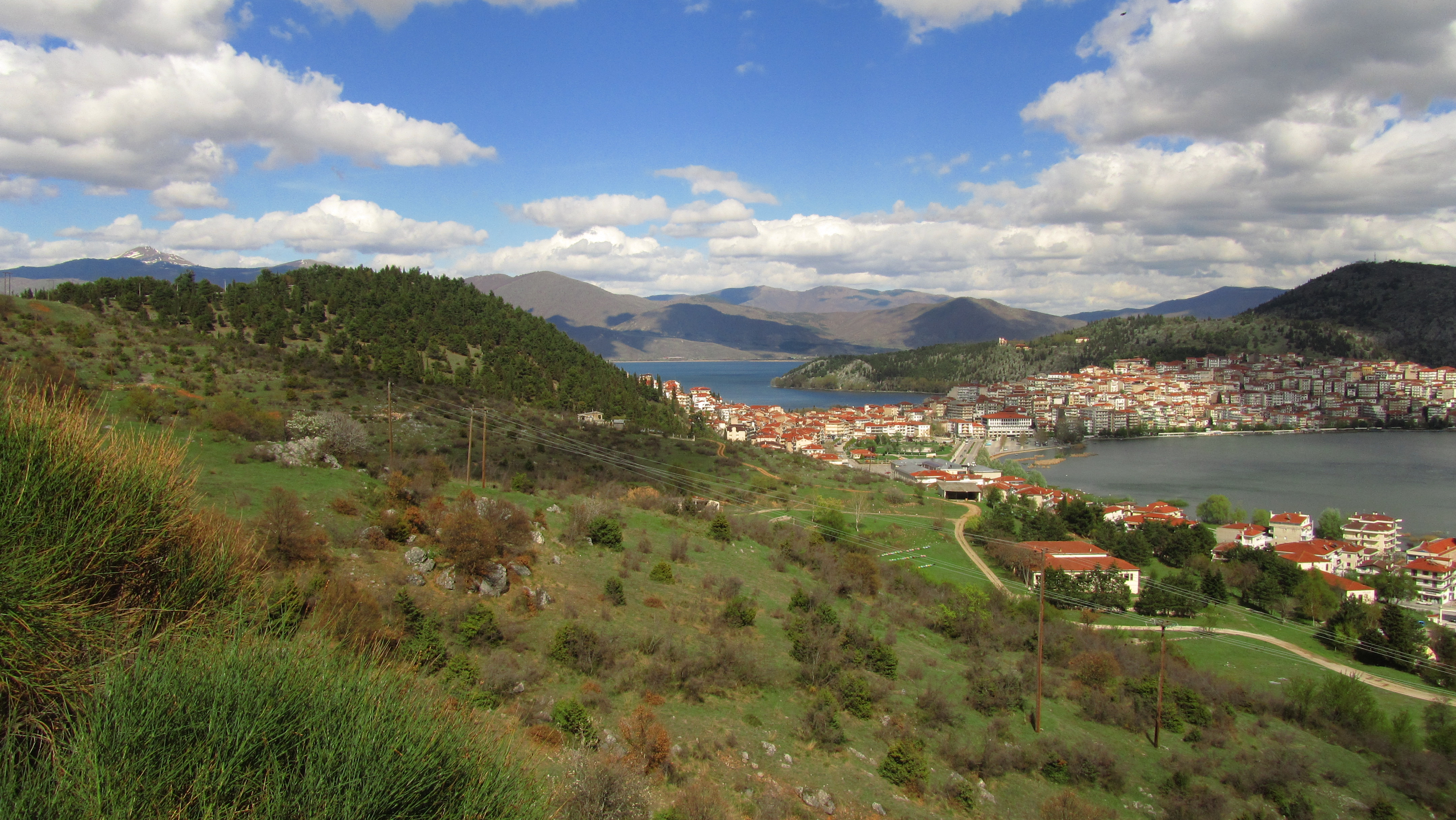
- Modern city of Kastoria over the site of Celetrum, which was on the isthmus in the lake
- Interactive map of Celetrum
- 40°31′18″N 21°15′45″E

Celetrum or Keletron (Ancient Greek: Κέλετρον) was a town of Orestis region in Upper Macedonia (today: Western Macedonia, Greece), situated on a peninsula which is surrounded by the waters of a lake, and has only a single entrance over a narrow isthmus which connects it with the continent. Celetrum has been identified with the Celaenidium or Kelainidion (Κελαινίδιον) of Hierocles. The town also bore the name of Diocletianopolis (Διοκλητιανούπολις) and Justinianopolis (Ἰουστινιανούπολις).

In the first campaign of the Romans in the Second Macedonian War, in 200 BCE, the consul Sulpicius, after having invested this place, which submitted to him, returned to Dassaretia, and from thence regained Apollonia, the place from which he had departed on this expedition. The position is so remarkable that there is no difficulty in identifying it with the modern town of Kastoria. The lake, which bears the same name, is about six miles long and four broad (10 by 6 km). The peninsula is nearly four miles (6 km) in circumference, and the outer point is not far from the centre of the lake. The later fortification of Kastoria consists only of a wall across the western extremity of the isthmus, which was built in the time of the Byzantine Empire, and has a wet ditch, making the peninsula an island. In the middle of the wall stands a square tower, through which was the only entrance to the town. The ruins of a parallel wall flanked with round towers, which in Byzantine times crossed the peninsula from shore to shore, excluding all the east part of it, in the 19th century divided the Greek and Turkish quarters of the town.

The site of Celetrum is in the modern city of Kastoria.
