= Agesimbrotus =

2nd-century Rhodian admiral

- Occupation: Military commander

Agesimbrotus (Ancient Greek: Ἀγεσίμβροτος) was the commander of the Rhodian fleet, consisting of 20 decked ships, during the Second Macedonian War, and sailed against Philip of Macedon from 200 to 197 BC. Agesimbrotus' fleet met with the 24 quinqueremes of Attalus I near Andros, and the two sailed for Euboea, and ravaged the lands belonging to Carystus. When that city received reinforcements from Chalcis, the fleets diverted to Eretria rather than engage a more prepared enemy. There they united with the fleet of Roman admiral Lucius Quinctius Flamininus, and the three of them laid heavy siege to Eretria, which surrendered after a nighttime assault by Quinctius. The three commanders sailed back to Carystus, which evacuated into the city citadel at the approach of such a fleet, and sent ambassadors to beg protection from Quinctius. The townspeople were freed and the Macedonian garrison was ransomed and deported, unarmed, to Boeotia.

Agesimbrotus was also one of the diplomatic party who accompanied the Roman consul Titus Quinctius Flamininus (brother of Lucius) in his meeting with Philip on a sea shore in the Malian Gulf, near Nicaea.
