= Őrbottyán =

- Flag Coat of arms

- Location of Őrbottyán in Hungary
- Coordinates: 47°41′13.96″N 19°16′59.63″E
- Country: Hungary
- Region: Central Hungary
- County: Pest
- Subregion: Veresegyházi
- Rank: Town

Area
  - Total: 27.37 km^{2} (10.57 sq mi)

Population (2011)
  - Total: 7,102
  - Density: 259.5/km^{2} (672.1/sq mi)
- Time zone: UTC+1 (CET)
  - Summer (DST): UTC+2 (CEST)
- Postal code: 2162
- Area code: +36 28
- Website: http://www.orbottyan.hu

Őrbottyán is a town in Pest county, Hungary.

== Name ==
Bottyán is an old Hungarian given name for boys, meaning mace. Prefix Őr literally means "guard" in Hungarian and refers to the nearby hill Őrhegy, which was a fortress in the Middle Ages.

== Geography ==
Őrbottyán lies 25 km (16 mi) from the center of Budapest at the foot of Gödöllő Hills, in the north-eastern sector of the Budapest metropolitan area. It lies 17 km (11 mi) km from M0, 15 km (9 mi) km from M2 and 10 km (6 mi) from M3 motorway. Budapest-Veresegyház-Vác suburban railway line crosses the town.

== History ==
Őrbottyán was created in 1970 with the unification of two small villages, named Őrszentmiklós and Vácbottyán.

Őrszentmiklós first mentioned in 1344 as villa Sancti Nicolai (Latin for Village of Saint Nicholas) and in 1390 as Zenth Myklos (Hungarian for Saint Nicholas). Vácbottyán first mentioned in 1332 as Botuna (old version of Bottyán) and in 1376 as Bathyan. According to the Hungarian Royal Treasury, the region was inhabited by ethnic Hungarians in 1495. The area became devastated due to the Ottoman wars in the 17th century, when Christians liberated the area in the 1680s they found only a few family in Őrszentmiklós, Vácbottyán was uninhabited.

Őrszentmiklós resettled by Calvinist and Roman Catholic Hungarians, while Vácbottyán was rebuilt by Lutheran Slovaks and Roman Catholic Hungarians in the 18th century. Later Slovaks adopted Hungarian language and they assimilated into the Hungarian majority.

== Demographics ==
According to the 2011 census the total population of Őrbottyán was 7,102, of whom there were 6,159 (86.7%) Hungarians, 44 (0.6%) Germans and 40 (0.6%) Romani, while 937 people (13.2%) did not declare their ethnicity. Excluding these people Hungarians made up 99.9% of the total population. In Hungary people can declare more than one ethnicity, so some people declared Hungarian and a minority one together.

In 2011 there were 1,903 (26.8%) Roman Catholic, 1,063 (15.0%) Hungarian Reformed (Calvinist) and 140 (2.0%) Lutheran in Őrbottyán. 1,351 people (19.0%) were irreligious and 187 (2.6%) Atheist, while 2,133 people (30.0%) did not declare their religion.

In 2011 there were 2,622 dwellings (houses) in Őrbottyán with an average floor space of 92 m^{2}, which is higher than the national average (77 m^{2}). The average gross personal income for an employee was 1,947,000 HUF in 2011, higher than the national average (1,869,000 HUF).

Historical population
Year	Pop.	±%
1870	1,017	—
1880	1,041	+2.4%
1890	1,172	+12.6%
1900	1,348	+15.0%
1910	1,453	+7.8%
1920	1,691	+16.4%
1930	2,001	+18.3%
1941	2,168	+8.3%
1949	2,332	+7.6%
1960	2,766	+18.6%
1970	3,194	+15.5%
1980	3,856	+20.7%
1990	4,048	+5.0%
2001	5,353	+32.2%
2011	7,102	+32.7%
