= Heracleides of Gyrton =

Heracleides (Ancient Greek: Ἡρακλείδης) of Gyrton in Thessaly, commanded the Thessalian cavalry in the army of Philip V of Macedon at the Battle of Cynoscephalae.
