= Dicaearchus of Aetolia =

Dicaearchus or Dicearchus (Ancient Greek: Δικαίαρχος) (died 196 BC) was an Aetolian commander and pirate. In 205–204 BC, Dicaearchus was employed by Philip V of Macedon to raid the Cyclades and Rhodian ships. Dicaearchus had a tradition in which wherever he landed he would build two temples, one to Asebeia, which means impiety, and another to Paranomia, which means lawlessness. Dicaearchus was later captured by the Egyptians, and he was racked and scourged before being put to death.
