= Orestis (region) =

Historical region of Upper Macedonia

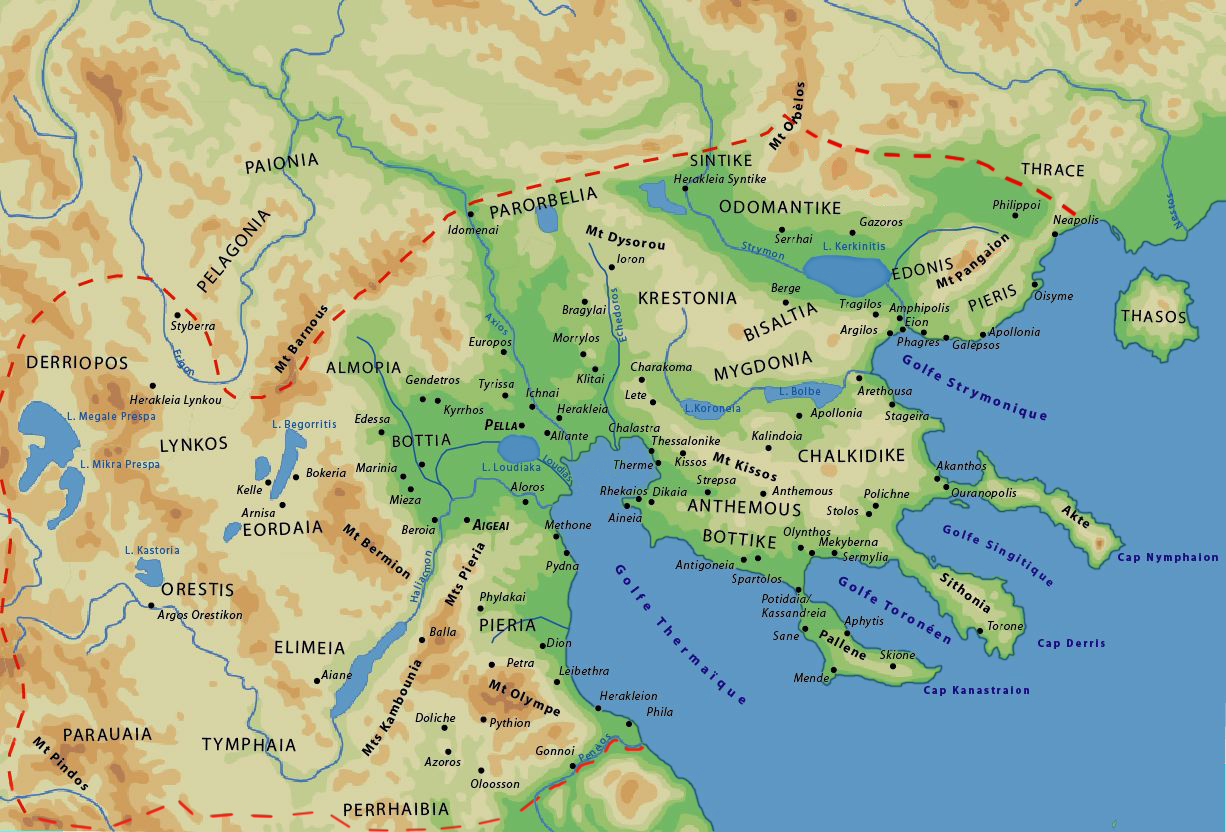
Map of the Kingdom of Macedon with Orestis located in the western districts of the kingdom.

Orestis (Greek: Ὀρεστίς) was a region of Upper Macedonia, corresponding roughly to the modern Kastoria regional unit located in West Macedonia, Greece. Its inhabitants were the Orestae, an ancient Greek tribe that was part of the Molossian tribal state or koinon.

== Etymology ==
According to the tradition of the Orestae, which is recorded by Theagenes and Strabo, their name was derived from Orestes, the son of Agamemnon, or a like-named son of his; though, the historical value of this myth is not acknowledged, and is considered improbable.

The tribal name of the Orestae appears to derive from the Greek plain appellative ὀρέστης 'mountain dweller' or 'mountaineer', as does the Greek personal name Orestes; compare to the similar Greek compounds ὀρεσι-δίαιτος and ὀρέσ-βιος (also a personal name), which also mean 'mountain dweller'. Some scholars have alternatively suggested that it derives from the Greek noun ὄρος 'mountain', suffixed with the typical West Greek -estae or Illyrian -st-.

== Geography ==
It is generally agreed that the region of Orestis encompassed the area around Lake Kastoria and the upper Haliacmon basin. The region was bounded geographically by the mountains Voio, Vitsi and Grammos and it extended to Prespa Lakes basin, in particular around Small Prespa Lake, where the ancient settlement of Lyke was located. Orestis bordered to the southwest Molossians and other Epirotic peoples, to the northwest Dassaretia, to the west Parauaia, to the northeast Eordaea and to the southeast Elimiotis.

Orestis in the south-west of the traditional region of Macedonia.

There is an overall agreement only for the eastern borders of the region, while about the rest of the Orestis' border areas there is some disagreement in scholarship. For Hammond, Orestis to the southeast ended after the point where the Pramoritsa flows into the Haliacmon (near Trapezitsa), while for Papazoglou it extended southwest of this point up to Palaiokastro and Siatista. For Papazoglou, the border with Dassaretia was defined by the Cangonj Pass while the Bilisht-Poloskë valley to the east of the pass was part of Orestia. Papazoglou adds that the mountains of Morava (between Korcë plain and Poloskë basin) and Grammos probably formed the border with Dassaretia and Parauaia. Karamitrou-Mentesidi is in favour of an excessive western expansion on lake Maliq and the region of today's Korcë. In general modern scholarship agrees on the western border of Orestis being found slightly west from the modern Greek-Albanian border. The northern boundary of Orestis corresponded to the southern shore of Small Prespa Lake.

Some important cities in the Orestis region based on ancient sources were Argos Orestikon, Celetrum (Kelethron), Diokliteionopolis, while epigraphic evidence cofirms the existence of Battyna and Lykke.

Orestis was traditionally a district of Upper Macedonia, forming its heartland in the Archaic and early Classical periods. It bordered with Lynkestis to the north, Eordaia to the north-east, Elimiotis to the south-east, Tymphaea to the south, and Illyrians to the west. Orestis formed the western border of Upper Macedonia, and Illyrians beyond this district constituted a persistent menace to the stability of the Kingdom of Macedon.

Orestis was among the regions of Upper Macedonia where the inhabitants were tribal peoples, who gave their name to the territory which was under their control, or alternatively who took their name from that territory. The tribal people that inhabited Orestis were the Orestae.

Orestis, like the rest of Upper Macedonia, was characterized by cold winters with rainfalls that were very heavy, and hot summers. In this region life was hard and mainly a matter of survival. According to the season of the year, the mostly nomadic pastoralist people of the area moved their flocks of cattle, goats and sheep to the various pasture lands. The region of Orestis was rich in summer pastures.

== History ==
An abundance of Mycenaean findings (both imported and locally made) from the late Bronze Age have been unearthed from various tombs in the region of Orestis. These include pottery, weapons, pins, brooches, as well as Linear B inscriptions.

Appian and Hesiod mention about the origins of the Argead dynasty of the Macedonian royal house that they were descendants of Argeas from Orestis, the later being son of the eponymous Macedon. The Argeads then wandered from Orestis to Lower Macedonia, where they founded the ancient Greek kingdom of Macedon. Also according to Appian, Argos Orestikon (in modern Orestida), rather than the Peloponnesian Argos, was the homeland of the Argead dynasty.

Both 6th century geographer Hecataeus and later Strabo identified the Orestea as Molossian population of the Epirote group. A 6th century BC silver finger ring bearing the common Orestian name "Antiochus", was found in the Dodona sanctuary. During the Peloponnesian War, a thousand Orestians led by King Antiochus, accompanied the Parauaeans of Epirus.

Around 370-365 BC Orestis was associated with the kingdom of Epirus possibly seeking protection from Illyrian tribes but also due to the expansion of Macedon. Like most of Upper Macedonia, Orestis only became part of Macedon after the early 4th century BC. This change possibly happened during the reign of Philip II of Macedon.

Natives of the region were: Pausanias of Orestis, the lover and assassin of Philip II, and three of Alexander's prominent diadochi: Perdiccas (son of Orontes), Seleucus I Nicator (son of Antiochus), his uncle Ptolemy, and the sons of a noble from Orestis named Alexander; Craterus and Amphoterus.

The region became independent again in 196 BC, when the Romans, after defeating Philip V (r. 221–179 BC), declared the Orestae free because they had supported the Roman cause in the recent war against Macedon.

== Religion ==
An inscription from the upper Devoll valley, lists Artemis with the epithet Syvonnike, while depictions of the goddess are found in various parts of the Orestis region.
