= Philoces =

Commander under Philip V of Macedon

Philoces (Ancient Greek: Φιλοκής) was Philip V of Macedon's prefect and commander on the island of Euboea. In 200 BC he was ordered by Philip to ravage Attica with 2,000 infantry and 200 cavalry. According to Polybius the ravaging that Philoces gave Attica was the worst since the Persian War. In 197 BC he tried to relieve the city of Eretria but he was driven off by the Roman army besieging the city. He was then put in charge of a group of 1,500 who went to Achaea and relieved Corinth and had Argos surrendered to them.

Philoces later gave Argos to Nabis of Sparta in return for a Spartan alliance with Macedon. Philoces still remained commander of the Macedonian garrison at Argos after the exchange and when Nabis deserted the Macedonians and went over to the Romans, Philoces was offered by the Romans to surrender the city to them. Philoces surrendered the city and was allowed free passage to Macedon. This is the last that is heard about Philoces.
