= Bargylia =

Ancient city on the coast of Caria in southwestern Anatolia, now Turkey

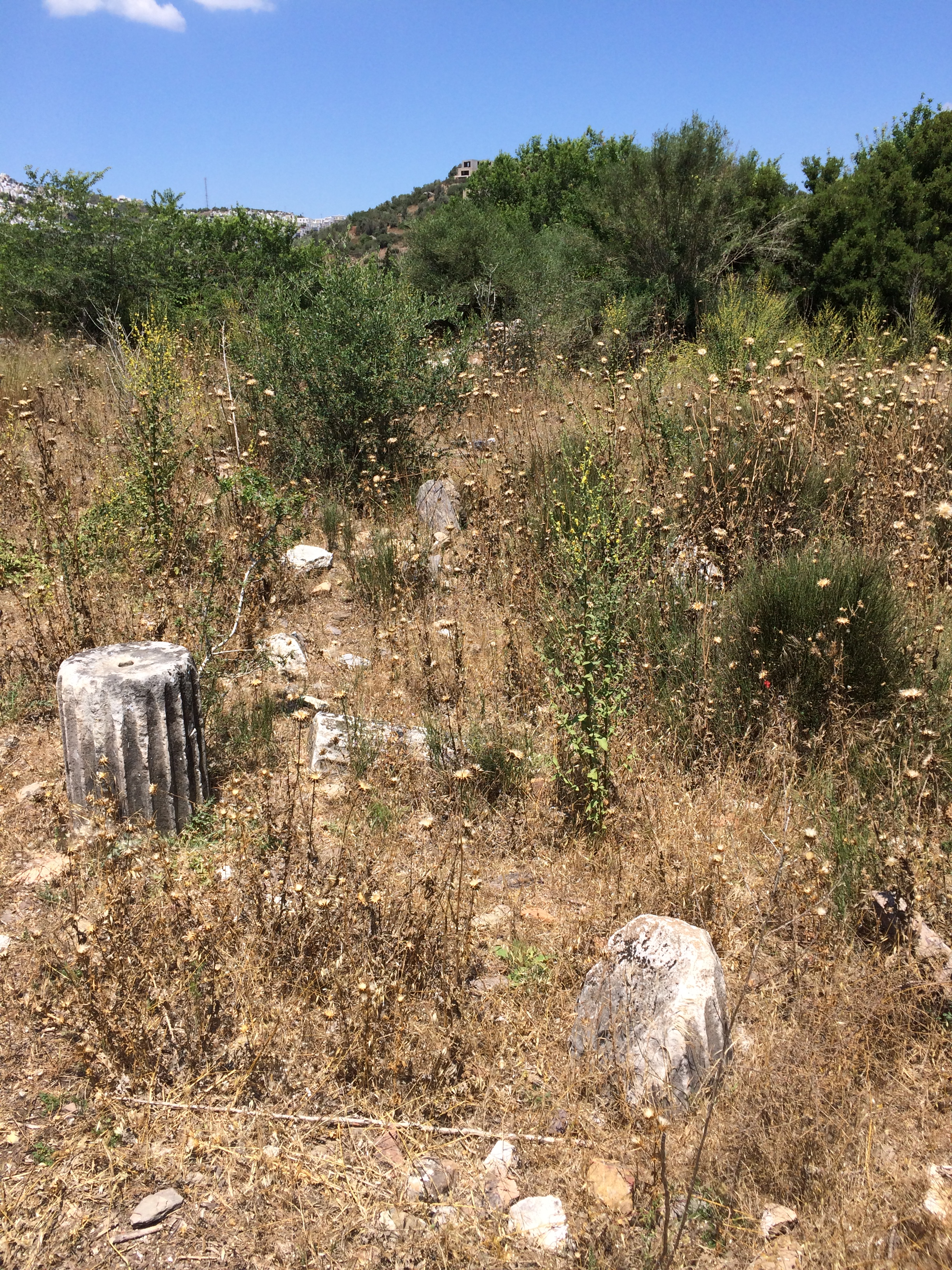
- The remains of fluted columns in Bargylia

- Location within Turkey
- 37.2000°N 27.5755°E
- Type: Settlement
- Location: Muğla Province, Turkey

Bargylia (/ˌbɑːrˈdʒɪliə/; Ancient Greek: Βαργυλία), was a city on the coast of ancient Caria in southwestern Anatolia (modern-day Turkey) between Iasos and Myndus. Bargylia's location corresponds to the modern Turkish town of Boğaziçi in Muğla Province.

The city was said to have been founded by Bellerophon in honour of his companion Bargylus (Greek: Βάργυλος), who had been killed by a kick from the winged horse Pegasus. Near Bargylia was the Temple of Artemis Cindyas. Strabo reports the local belief that rain would fall around the temple but never touch it. Artemis Cindyas and Pegasus appear on coinage of Bargylia.

In 201/200 BC during the Cretan War King Philip V of Macedon wintered his fleet in Bargylia when he was blockaded by the Pergamene and Rhodian fleets.

Protarchus the Epicurean philosopher, the mentor of Demetrius Lacon, was a native of Bargylia.

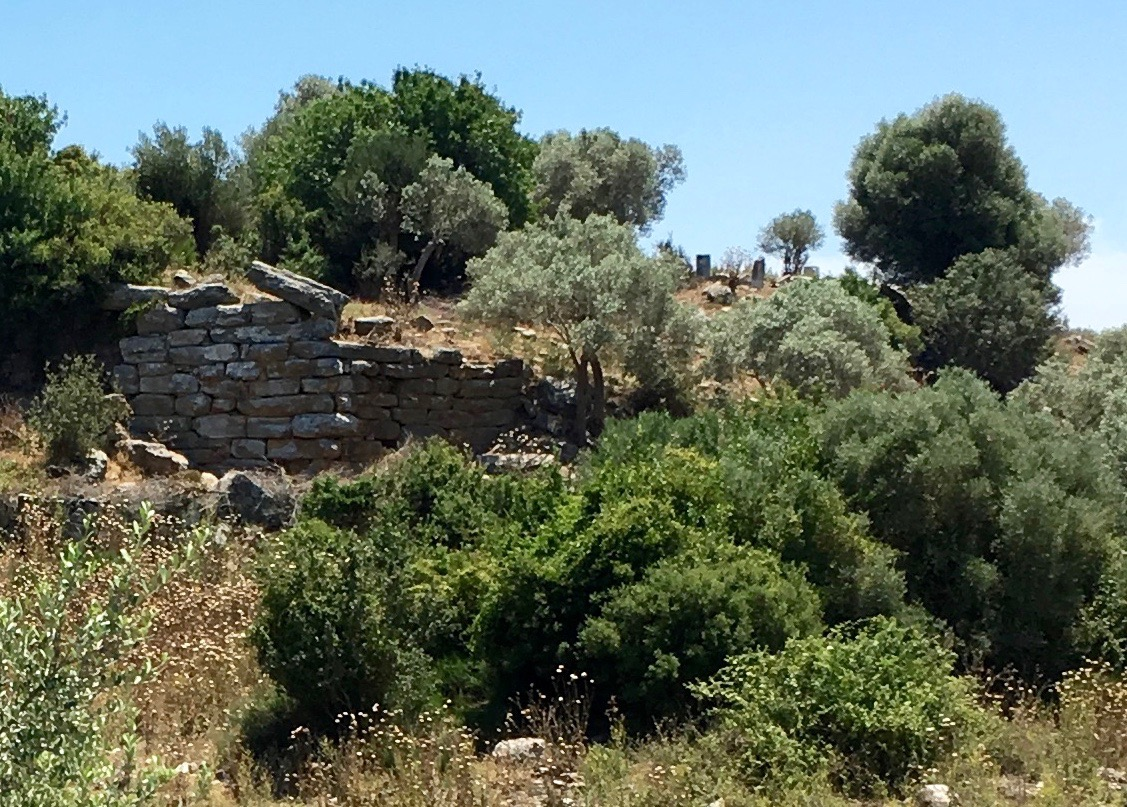
The ruins of a containing or defensive wall at Bargylia.

On a headland next to the harbour at Bargylia there once stood a large tomb monument. Dating from the Hellenistic period (between 200-150 BC), the monument was dedicated to the sea monster Scylla. The over life-size figure of Scylla, along with a group of deferential and expectant hounds, was originally located at the apex of the building. The remains of this sculptural group, along with other parts of the stone structure, can be found in the British Museum's collection.

There are currently reasonably extensive ruins at Bargylia, including the remnants of a temple, a theatre, a large defensive wall and a palaestra.

== Visit to Bargylia by Freya Stark ==
The travel writer Freya Stark visited Bargylia when she was touring Caria in the 1950s. Below is an extract from an account of her travels that was published in The Geographical Journal.

Even more remote, more uninhabited and more deeply forgotten is Bargylia, in which Philip V of Macedon spent a winter fighting, and Rome first gave its freedom to a city of Asia. It is difficult to find, though only half an hour's sail from Gullük, up an inlet that opens among hills. Not a house was in sight when we sailed here nor any sign of animal life except some cattle grazing, and two boats fishing in the sound.

The water grew too shallow for the Elfin, and the dinghy landed us in swamp among rushes as sharp and painful as miniature javelins. From tussock to tussock we gained the city's slopes. Stone or marble showed it here and there, blanketed in grass among the yellow iris, with white columns laid on their sides by the Byzantines and used for a foundation.

A Yurük came up with friendly manners to offer the hospitality of his tent. No one, said he, came to Bargylia, except the sister of the member for Milas, a good young archaeologist, who had looked – he waved his hand over the prostrate temples, odeon, stoa, fluted columns, that lay as if asleep under the grass. The Elfin's engine was now beginning to splutter as she drew towards us, leaving a furrow in the sound scarcely bigger than that of the centuries before her; and we coasted south till the night came upon us in a landlocked bay, so still that one felt one could weigh the darkness, as if it lay soft and heavy in one's hand.

== Proposed sale ==
According to the country's major newspaper Hürriyet, the city of Bargylia is on sale for the trifle of 22 million Turkish liras (around eight million euros).

According to Hürriyet, a news Ancient Greek City of Bargylia in Turkey on Sale for Eight Million Euros dated on 13 January 2015 states Construction in first degree Archaeological site is not allowable as per Judicial system of Turkey, therefore advertisement highlights that no excavations have been performed on it till date, so the new owner(s) can enjoy an amphitheater hinted to be underground, an area that is believed to belong to the city's Temple, the remains of a Roman bath and a necropolis from the Byzantine era.

Turkish archaeologists have called the country's Ministry of Culture and Tourism several times to expropriate numerous archaeological sites such as the one in Bargylia in order to ensure their protection on their behalf, due to the state's inability to guarantee the security. Binnur Celebi, a senior member of the Archaeologists Association said, “Unfortunately, due to an insufficient budget, archaeological sites are only expropriated during excavations or urban projects," and warned that some owners may not understand the historical value their site's status, aiming to open them for construction. He added, "Private ownership of such sites is obstructing archaeological work. However, the person or persons who acquire those sites can absolutely not conduct any construction activities."

The agent promoting the ancient city's sale, Halil Okan Tavasli, said that it has already attracted a considerable number of potential buyers but no agreement has been signed up to the date of 20 January 2015.

In 2018, newspaper reported that since no buyer was found the price has been dropped to £5.6 million.
