= Athenagoras of Macedon =

Athenagoras (Ancient Greek: Ἀθηναγόρας) was a Macedonian general of Philip V and Perseus. He fought against Dardani and Romans.
