= Battyna =

Ancient Macedonian town

Coordinates: 40°27′28″N 21°05′56″E

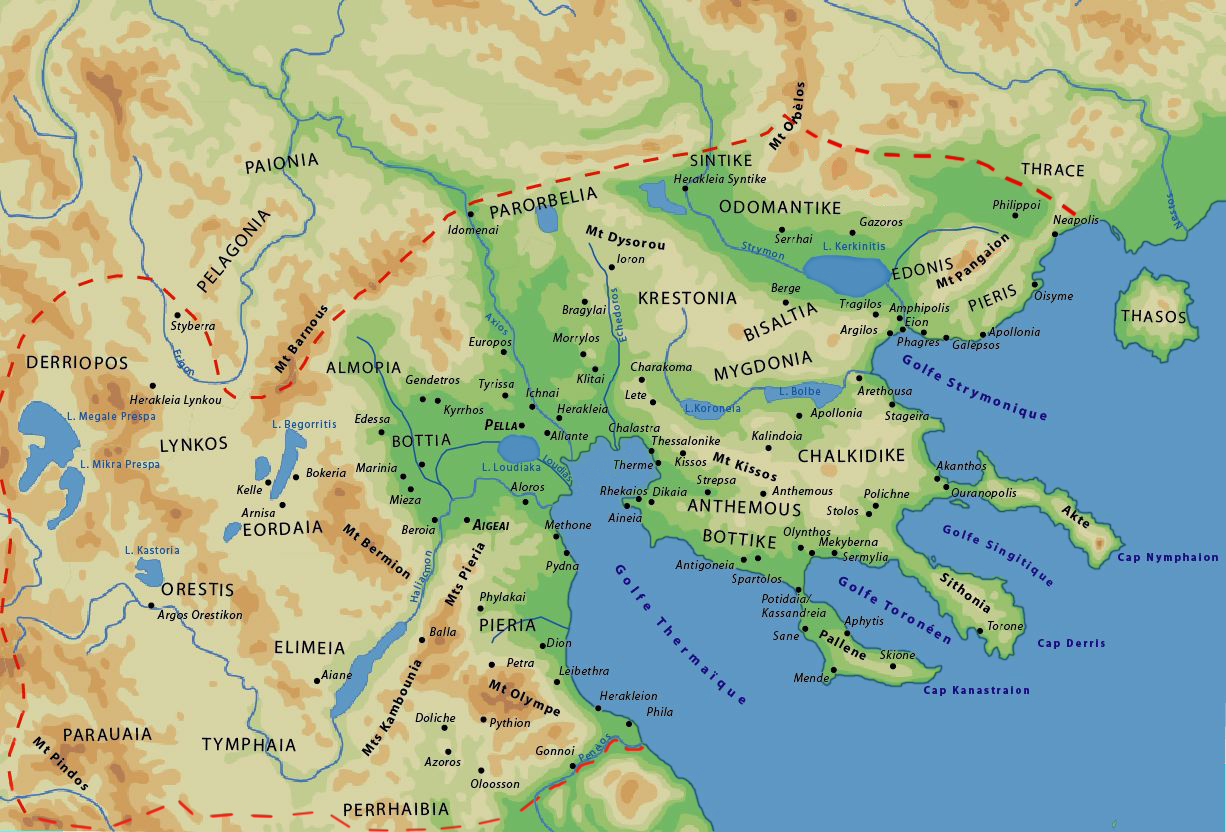
Map of the Kingdom of Macedon with Orestis located in the western districts of the kingdom.

Battyna (Greek: Βάττυνα) was an ancient town in Orestis, Upper Macedonia, near modern Kranochori village. The only decree of Battyna that has come down to us belongs to the Roman period (193 AD) and it is signed by 56 citizens. Alexander son of Leonidas, the politarch of Battyna, administers affairs regarding the land and property of the region, according to the diataxis (law) of a certain Gentianus (perhaps Decimus Terentius Gentianus, who was proconsul of Macedonia 117- 119 AD).
