= Heracleides of Tarentum =

Ancient Greek architect and military commander

Heracleides (Ancient Greek: Ἡρακλείδης), also known as Heracleides of Tarentum (Ancient Greek: Ἡρακλείδης ὁ Ταραντῖνος) (fl. 212–199 BC) was an ancient Greek architect from Tarentum in Magna Graecia who later served as a counselor and military commander under king Philip V of Macedon.

During the Second Punic War the architect Heracleides had been entrusted with some repairs of the walls of Tarentum (at the time controlled by the Carthaginians), when he was accused of intending to betray the city to the Romans. In consequence of this charge he fled from his home town, and took refuge in the Roman camp, but was soon suspected of having opened secret negotiations with Hannibal and the Carthaginian garrison. After this double treachery he thought it prudent to quit Italy and repaired to the court of Philip V of Macedon. There, by his ability and cunning, he made himself useful to the king as a convenient tool for carrying into execution the most nefarious schemes, and ultimately rose to a high place in his favour and confidence. He is said to have especially gained these by the address with which, pretending to have been ill-used and driven into banishment by Philip, he ingratiated himself with the Rhodians, and succeeded in setting fire to their arsenal, and burning a great part of their fleet. It is not difficult to believe that a man who had risen to power by such arts as these should have abused it when attained: and we are told that he made use of his influence with the king to get rid of all those that were opposed to his views, and even induced him to put to death five of the leading members of his council of state at once. But by these and other such measures he rendered Philip so obnoxious to his subjects, that the king at length found himself obliged to yield to the popular clamour, displaced Heracleides, whom he had not long before employed in the command of his fleet, and threw him into prison, in the year 199 BC. Whether he was subsequently put to death we are not informed.
