= Serrheum =

Serrheum or Serreion (Ancient Greek: Σέρρειον), or Serrhium or Serrion (Σέρριον), was a town on the southern coast of ancient Thrace, on a promontory of the same name (now Cape Makri). It lay to the west of Maroneia, and opposite to the island of Samothrace. It is repeatedly mentioned by Demosthenes, as having been taken by Philip II of Macedon (346 BCE), contrary to his engagements with the Athenians; and Livy states that it was one of the Thracian towns captured by Philip V of Macedon in the year 200 BCE.

Its site is unlocated.

== See also ==
- Greek colonies in Thrace
