= Battle of Chios (201 BC) =

201 BC battle of the Cretan War

- Part of the Cretan War
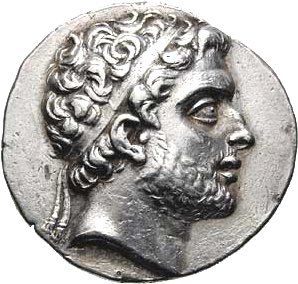
- Philip V of Macedon.
Date	201 BC
Location	Off the shore of Chios
Result	Rhodian alliance victory

Belligerents
Macedon	Rhodes; Pergamum; Byzantium; Cyzicus

Commanders and leaders
Philip V of Macedon	Attalus I Theophiliscus of Rhodes (DOW)

Strength
Around 200 ships	Around 100 ships

Casualties and losses
92 ships sunk 7 captured 9,000 dead 2,000 captured	Rhodes: 3 ships sunk 60 dead Pergamum: 3 ships sunk 2 captured 70 dead

The Battle of Chios was fought in 201 BC between the fleet of Philip V of Macedon and the combined fleet of Rhodes, Pergamum, Byzantium and Cyzicus.

The Cretan War had started in 205 BC when the Macedonians and their pirate and Cretan allies had started attacking Rhodian ships as Rhodes had the richest merchant fleet in the Aegean. The navies of Rhodes' allies Pergamum, Byzantium and Cyzicus joined the Rhodian fleet and then defeated the Macedonian fleet off Chios.

== Prelude ==
With the First Macedonian War over, Philip started to rebuild his fleet to a size that could challenge the fleets of the Rhodians, Pergamese and Ptolemies. Philip wanted to crush the dominant naval power in the Aegean, his ally Rhodes. He formed alliances with Aetolian and Spartan pirates as well as a few powerful Cretan city states.

== Battle ==
In the battle the flagship of Philip V of Macedon, a very large galley bireme or trireme with ten banks of rowers, accidentally rammed one of her own ships when it strayed across her path, and giving her a powerful blow in the middle of the oarbox, well above the waterline, stuck fast, since the helmsman had been unable in time to check or reverse the ship's momentum. Trapped, the flagship was put out of action by two enemy ships, which rammed her below the waterline on each side.

The Macedonian navy outnumbered the allied fleet but lacked experience for Philip had raised it just a few years prior to the battle. This was a crucial deciding factor.

The battle seemed to be going against Philip, but then Attalus attempted to prevent one of his ships from being sunk and was driven onto the shore. Philip captured Attalus's ship, and towed it back through the battle, convincing the rest of the Pergamese fleet that the king was dead. The Pergamese fleets then withdrew. The Macedonians took advantage of this lull to escape from the victorious Rhodians.

== Aftermath ==
The losses Philip suffered at Chios dealt a crippling blow to Macedonian naval power. So much so that the Macedonian fleet played little part in the Second Macedonian War.

When Attalus ran his ship aground, he escaped by land. He only avoided capture because he left his immense riches on board his vessel, which distracted his Macedonian pursuers long enough for him to get away.

The victorious Theophiliscus later died from the wounds that he received during the battle.

The Battle of Lade (201 BCE) was a continuation of the same hostilities by the belligerent parties (Mommsen, Bk III, Ch VIII).

== Primary sources ==
- Polybius, translated by Frank W. Walbank, (1979). The Rise of the Roman Empire. New York: Penguin Classics. ISBN 0-14-044362-2.
- Battle of Chios, 201.

== Secondary sources ==
- Peter Green, (1990). Alexander to Actium: The Historical Evolution of the Hellenistic Age. Los Angeles: University of California Press. ISBN 0-500-01485-X.
- Theocharis Detorakis, (1994). A History of Crete. Heraklion: Heraklion. ISBN 960-220-712-4.
