= Theophiliscus =

Theophiliscus (Ancient Greek: Θεοφιλίσκος) (died 205 BC) was the commander of the Rhodian quinquereme fleet at the Battle of Chios. The battle ended in a Rhodian and Pergamese victory but the victorious Theophiliscus later died of the wounds that he received during the battle.
