= Histiaeotis =

Northwest district of ancient Thessaly

Histiaeotis in NW Thessaly

Histiaeotis (Ancient Greek: Ἱστιαιῶτις, romanized: Histiaiotis) or Hestiaeotis (Ἑστιαιῶτις - Hestiaiotis) was a northwest district of ancient Thessaly, part of the Thessalian tetrarchy, roughly corresponding to the modern Trikala regional unit. Anciently, it was inhabited by the Hestiaeotae (Ἑστιαιῶται), and the Peneius may be described in general as its southern boundary. It occupied the passes of Mount Olympus, and extended westward as far as Pindus. The demonym of the district's inhabitants is Histiaeotes (Ἱστιαιῶται, Histiaiotai). In epigraphy, the regional name occurs as Hestiotai, ambassadors in Athens and Histiotai in the Thessalian grain decree for Rome (see Pelasgiotis) but most similarly written names are related to Histiaea, an Attic deme and a city in North Euboea. The epigraphical Aeolic Greek vocalism of Hestiaeotis is bizarre and idiomatic.

Histiaeotis is first mentioned by Herodotus, when.. in the time of Dorus the son of Hellen, (Dorians) were in the territory around Mounts Ossa and Olympus, known as Histiaeotis. Then they were evicted from Histiaeotis by the Cadmeans and settled on Mount Pindus and was called Makednon; and thence it moved afterwards to Dryopis, and from Dryopis it came finally to Peloponnesus, and began to be called Dorian.. Histiaeotis was also the seat of the Perrhaebi (Eth. Περραιβός), a warlike and powerful tribe, who possessed in historical times several towns strongly situated upon the mountains. They are mentioned by Homer as taking part in the Trojan War, and were regarded as genuine Hellenes, being one of the Amphictyonic states. The part of Hestiaeotis inhabited by them was frequently called Perrhaebia, but it never formed a separate Thessalian province. The Perrhaebi are said at one time to have extended south of the Peneius as far as the Lake Boebeis, but to have been driven out of this district by the mythical race of the Lapithae. It is probable that at an early period the Perrhaebi occupied the whole of Hestiaeotis, but were subsequently driven out of the plain and confined to the mountains by the Thessalian conquerors from Thesprotia.

Strabo also writes that in earlier times Histiaeotis was called Doris, "but when the Perrhaebians took possession of it, who had already subdued Histiaea in Euboea and had forced its inhabitants to migrate to the mainland, they called the country Histiaeotis after these Histiaeans, because of the large number of these people who settled there"; but this is an uncertified statement, probably founded alone upon similarity of name. Homer mentions another ancient tribe in this part of Thessaly called the Aethices, who are placed by Strabo upon the Thessalian side of Pindus near the sources of the Peneius. They are described as a barbarous tribe, living by plunder and robbery.

Strabo adds that Histiaeotis and Dolopia comprise Upper Thessaly, which is in a straight line with Upper Macedonia, as is Lower Thessaly with Lower Macedonia.

The towns of Hestiaeotis were: Aeginium, Azorus, Cyretiae, Doliche, Elone, Ericinium, Eritium, Gomphi, Ithome, Limnaea, Malloea, Meliboea, Metropolis, Mylae, Oechalia, Oloosson, Oxyneia, Pelinnaeum, Phacium, Phaestus, Phaloria, Pharcadon, Pheca or Phecadum, Pialia, Pythium, Silana, and Tricca; and subsequently, Atrax, Charax, Condylon, Eudieru, Gonnus or Gonni, Lapathus, Leimone, Orthe, Phalanna.

Notable sanctuaries of the region were of Asclepius at Tricca, of Aphrodite Kastnia at Metropolis and of Zeus at Pelinna. In the Catalogue of Ships: "they that held Tricca and Ithome of the crags, and Oechalia, city of Oechalian Eurytus, these again were led by the two sons of Asclepius, the skilled healers Podaleirius and Machaon".

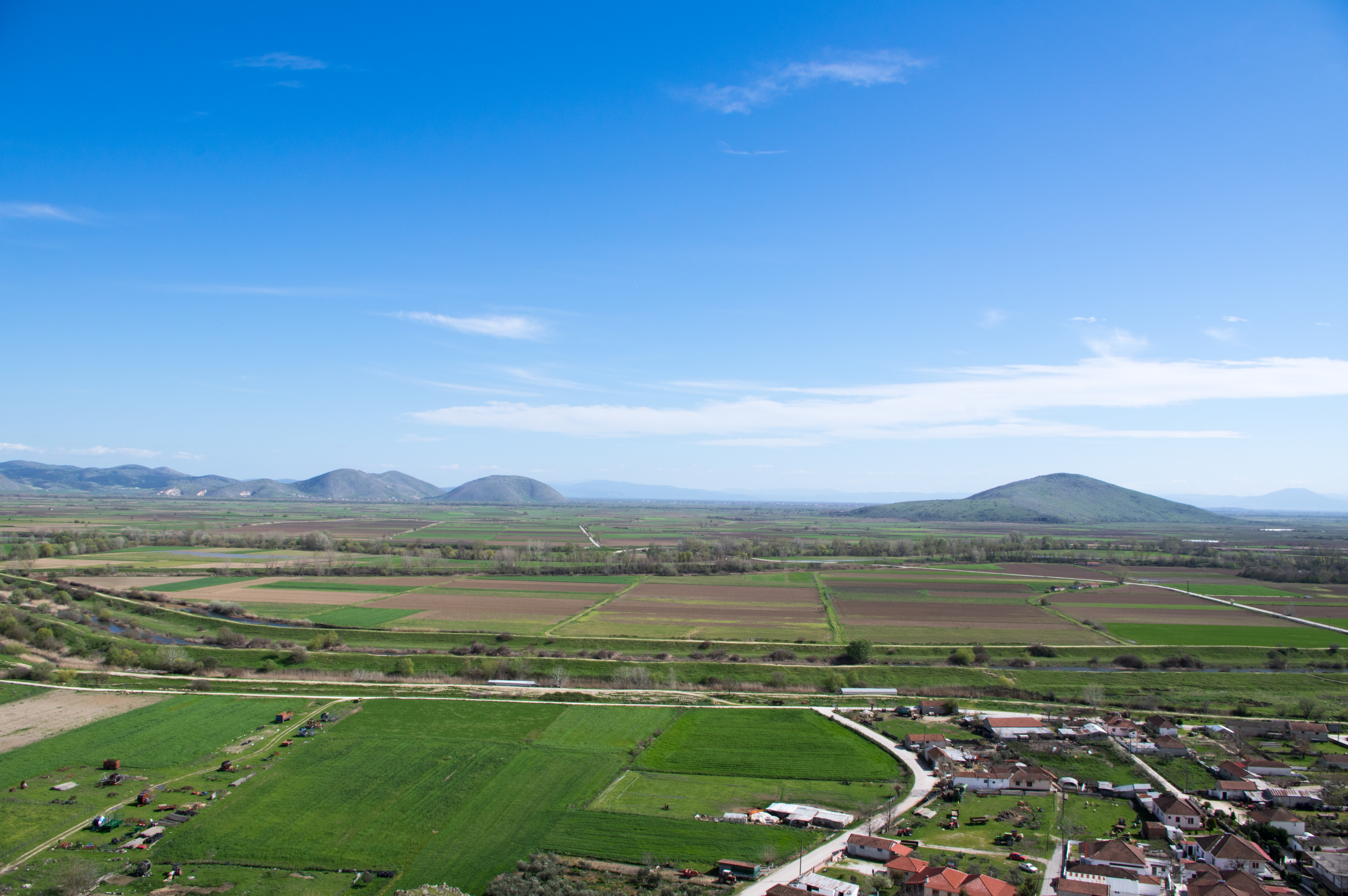
The plain of Kambos, ancient Histiaeotis. View from Klokotos, site of ancient Pharkadon.
