= Charax =

Charax (Χάραξ) may refer to:

- Aulus Claudius Charax, a 2nd-century AD Roman senator and historian
- Charax, alternate name of Acharaca, an ancient oracle site in Lydia, Anatolia
- Charax, alternate name of Charakipolis, an ancient town in Lydia, Anatolia
- Charax, alternate name of Tralles, an ancient city in Lydia, Anatolia
- Charax (Corsica), ancient site in Corsica
- Charax (Lesser Armenia), ancient site in Lesser Armenia (now in Turkey)
- Charax (Media Atropatene), ancient site in Media Atropatene (now in Iran)
- Charax (Pontus), town of ancient Pontus (now in Turkey)
- Charax (Thessaly), ancient site in Thessaly, Greece
- Charax Alexandri, ancient site in Phrygia, Anatolia
- Charax, Crimea, the largest Roman military settlement excavated in the Crimea
- Charax Spasinu, an ancient port at the head of the Persian Gulf
- Charax Sidae or Anthemusias, an ancient Mesopotamian town near Seleucia in Mesopotamia
- Charax, Rhagiana, a Seleucid and Parthian city in the province of Rhagiana, in the area nearby modern-day Rey
- Charax, Bithynia, an ancient Greek town in Turkey and possible location of the death of Constantine the Great
- Cape Charax, or possibly Cape Lithinon, a promontory at the southernmost point of the island of Crete
- Charax (fish), a genus of fish in the family Characidae
