= Eritium =

Town of Perrhaebia

Map showing ancient Thessaly. Eritium is shown to upper centre.

Eritium was a town of Perrhaebia in ancient Thessaly. It appears to have been near Cyretiae, since it was taken along with the latter town by Marcus Baebius Tamphilus in 191 BCE.

William Martin Leake placed it at Paleokastro, a village above Sykies, on the left bank of the Vúrgaris, a river of Tripolitis. In the church of St. George in Domeniko, which occupies the site of the ancient Cyretiae, Leake noticed an inscribed stone, on which the name of Apollodorus is followed by a word beginning ΕΡΗ, which he conjectures with much probability may be the place called Eritium by Livy. Modern scholars treat Eritium as unlocated.
