= Callithera =

Coordinates: 39°13′03″N 21°59′18″E

Callithera was a town of Thessaly in the district Thessaliotis, of uncertain site. Livy relates that the retreat of Philip V of Macedon after the Battle of the Aous (198 BC) allowed the Aetolians to occupy much of Thessaly. Whilst they were devastating the fields round Metropolis the townsmen who had mustered in force to defend their walls inflicted a repulse upon them. Then, in an attack upon Callithera they met with similar resistance, but after an obstinate struggle they drove the defenders back within their walls. As there was no hope whatever of their effecting the capture of the place, they had to content themselves with this success. The Aetolians then continued to attack nearby Acharrae, Theuma, and Celathara, the latter two which they plundered.

Its location has been identified with remains at Agios Yannis that are close to the current village of Palouri in the municipality of Makrakomi.
