= Metropolis (Perrhaebia) =

Coordinates: 39°37′33″N 22°40′53″E

Map showing ancient Thessaly. Metropolis is shown in the upper centre.

Metropolis (Ancient Greek: Μητρόπολις) was a town located in the region of Perrhaebia in Ancient Thessaly. Stephanus of Byzantium mentions it as a town in Thessaly, distinct from the better-known city of the same name.

This settlement is likely the Metropolis referred to by Livy in his account of the military campaign of Antiochus III the Great in 191 BCE. According to Livy, after landing at Demetrias, the Seleucid king captured Pherae, followed by Crannon, Cypaera, Metropolis, and other nearby strongholds—excluding Atrax and Gyrton—before advancing to Larissa.

This narrative situates Metropolis within Perrhaebia, and its archaeological site has been identified by William Martin Leake near Atrax, at the modern village of Kastri, within the municipal unit of Lakereia. The ancient name Μητροπολίτης has also been found inscribed at the site.
