= Asterium =

City in ancient Thessaly

Map showing ancient Thessaly. Asterium - under its later name Peiresiae - is shown toward the centre, near Mt. Titanus.

Asterium or Asterion (Ancient Greek: τὸ Ἀστέριον) was a city in ancient Thessaly mentioned in the Catalogue of Ships in Homer's Iliad as belonging to Eurypylus. Homer speaks of "Asterium and the white summits of Titanus – Ἀστέριον Τιτάνοιό τε λευκὰ κάρηνα. Strabo places the city in the neighbourhood of Cierium. Stephanus of Byzantium relates that the place was later called Peiresia (Πειρεσία), no doubt from the Argonautica of Apollonius of Rhodes who describes the place as near the junction of rivers Apidanus (the modern Pharsalitis) and Enipeus.

Strabo, who places Titanus near Arne, also speaks of its white colour. Peiresiae is said by Apollonius to have been near Mount Phylleium. Near Mount Phylleium Strabo places a city Phyllus, noted for a temple of Apollo Phylleius. Statius calls this city Phylli. William Smith conjectures that the town of Iresiae mentioned by Livy, is perhaps a false reading for Peiresiae; however, modern scholars treat the town as distinct from Peiresiae and suggest the site is to be found in Magnesia not at Peiresiae.

Under its later name, Peiresia, the town was a polis (city-state), and minted silver coins with the legend «ΠΕΙΡΑΣΙΕΩΝ».

The editors of the Barrington Atlas of the Greek and Roman World identify Asterium's location at the modern village of Sykies (Συκιές) in the municipal unit of Fyllo, municipality of Palamas, Karditsa.
