= Ithome (Thessaly) =

Coordinates: 39°24′57″N 21°47′56″E

Map showing ancient Thessaly. Ithome is shown in the west centre south of Tricca.

Ithome (Ancient Greek: Ἰθώμη) was a town of Histiaeotis in ancient Thessaly, described by Homer as the "rocky Ithome", is placed by Strabo within a quadrangle formed by the four cities, Tricca, Metropolis, Pelinnaeum, and Gomphi. It occupied the site of the castle which stands on the summit above the modern village of Fanari (in the modern municipality of Ithomi, which reflects the ancient name). Visiting the place in the nineteenth century, William Martin Leake observed, near the north-western face of the castle, some remains of a very ancient Hellenic wall, consisting of a few large masses of stone, roughly hewn on the outside, but accurately joined to one another without cement.

The town's original name was Thome (Θώμη). Other names borne by the town were Thoumaion (Θούμαιον), Thamai (Θαμαι), and Thamiai (Θαμιαι).
