= Siege of Gomphi =

Siege in 48 BC

- Part of Caesar's invasion of Macedonia during Caesar's civil war
Date	29 July 48 BC
Location	Gomphi, Macedonia, Roman Republic 39.446177°N 21.672674°E
Result	Caesarian victory
Territorial changes	Capture of Gomphi by Julius Caesar

Belligerents
Caesar's faction	City of Gomphi

Commanders and leaders
Gaius Julius Caesar; Gnaeus Domitius Calvinus	Androsthenes of Thessaly †; Magistrates of Gomphi †

Units involved
Legio VI; Legio VII; Legio VIII; Legio IX; Legio X Legio XI; Legio XII; Legio XIV	Gomphi militia

Strength
30,000 infantry 2,000 cavalry	Unknown

Casualties and losses
Unknown	Unknown

The siege of Gomphi was a brief military confrontation during Caesar's Civil War. Following defeat at the Battle of Dyrrhachium, the men of Gaius Julius Caesar besieged the Thessalian city of Gomphi. The city fell in a few hours and Caesar's men were allowed to sack Gomphi.

== Prelude ==
After unsuccessfully besieging Gnaeus Pompeius Magnus ("Pompey the Great") at Dyrrhachium, Julius Caesar retreated south and east to Apollonia. At Apollonia Caesar briefly stopped to tend to his wounded, pay his army, encourage his allies, and leave garrisons, before setting off east again. Four cohorts were left to garrison Apollonia, another three at Oricum and one at Lissus.

The plan which Caesar had formulated was to link up with Gnaeus Domitius Calvinus who was based near Heraclea, unbeknownst to Caesar, conducting operations against Metellus Scipio. This was so as to keep as many contingencies in play as possible, if Pompey crossed to Italia then Caesar would link up his army with that of Domitius then head off through Illyricum and down into the peninsula himself. Otherwise, he might draw Pompey inland away from his coastal supply lines and fight a more favourable pitched battle at a place of his choosing. If Pompey chose instead to besiege Caesar's own garrisoned cities and supply lines then an assault against Scipio would be initiated to draw him away. In response to Caesar's movements, Pompey put his army on the march in an attempt to reach Domitius himself and thus mitigate the entire plan.

Due to the fact that neither Caesar nor Domitius knew of each other's exact whereabouts, and also the fact that many local communities were beginning to cooperate with Pompey, the Caesarian messengers were having no luck delivering their messages. Fortunately for Caesar, a detachment of auxiliary Allobroges who had recently deserted Pompey came into contact with some of Domitius' scouts and shared all they knew of the situation. Having been briefed by these scouts, Domitius managed to evade Pompey's advance and meet up with Caesar near Aeginium.

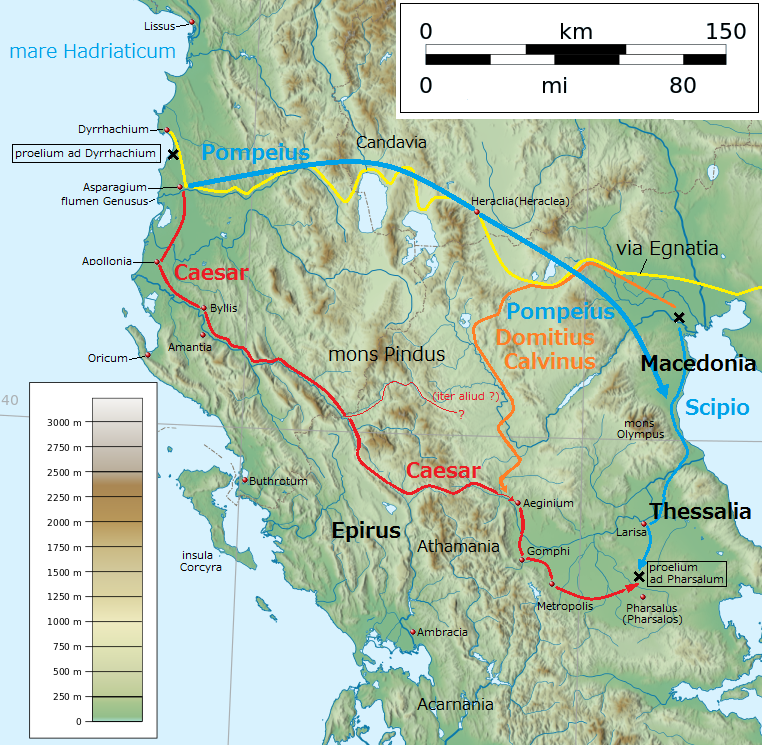
Roman campaigns in Macedonia following the Battle of Dyrrachium.

== Siege ==
With his forces united Caesar moved his army towards Thessaly and into lands which had not yet been foraged by any of the marauding Roman armies. During this time he was able to regroup with some of his displaced men but in the meantime, Pompey had been spreading news which exaggerated his recent defeat at Dyrrhachium and many local communities saw cooperation with Caesar as a poor investment.

One such of these communities was the first city on the road from Epirus to Thessaly, the city of Gomphi which had, at the order of the city magistrates, closed its gates and refused to allow entry to Caesar's men. This was in spite of the fact that Caesar claims Gomphi had previously sent envoys promising that he was free to enter the city and make use of its resources. The praetor of Thessaly, a man named Androsthenes, had commanded all citizens, freedmen and slaves to retreat inside Gomphi as he intended to oppose Caesar. He also sent messengers to Pompey and Scipio urging them to hasten to him as while he was confident the city could hold for a short while, it was not prepared for a long siege.

In response to this act of defiance Caesar immediately put the city under siege. Caesar declared to his troops that it was imperative the city be taken quickly due to three factors; it would provide riches that would go a long way towards restoring his army's strength, a swift victory would send a message to the other communities in the area that resistance was useless, and that it was vital that the city fall before reinforcements arrived. Lacking any organised defence the city quickly succumbed to these reinvigorated, veteran soldiers who flooded into the streets after only a few hours.

Breaking with his strategy up until this point, Caesar allowed his men to sack the city which resulted in many killings and rapes as well as wholesale plundering. Twenty of the city magistrates who had acted with such defiance, likely including Androsthenes, committed suicide in an apothecary rather than be subjected to Caesar's wrath.

== Aftermath ==
The siege of Gomphi is notable as the first instance during the civil war where Caesar allowed his men to enact retribution against their defeated enemies. In his earlier campaign in Italia for example he advanced far down the peninsula by dealing out clemency to those who stood against him, leading to many cities throwing open their gates to him. This decision at Gomphi, therefore, illustrates that Caesar was not opposed to showing ruthlessness when he felt the situation was desperate enough to require it.

Caesar's men broke camp the following day and some sources claim that the soldiers were more of a drunken mob than a disciplined army when they left Gomphi. They soon arrived outside of Metropolis where the magistrates within initially reacted by manning the walls and preparing for a siege, however, once Caesar presented them prisoners from Gomphi they resolved to open their gates to him.

After the episode at Gomphi many nearby cities were fearful and Caesar found no more opposition in Thessaly, besides at Larissa which was held by Scipio. Caesar decided to encamp his men in order to replenish their strength and awaited the arrival of Pompey before resuming operations. The two generals would soon clash at the Battle of Pharsalus from which Caesar would emerge victorious, a major turning point in the civil war.
