= Gomfoi =

Gomfoi Γόμφοι
- Municipal unit
- Location within the regional unit

- Location within Greece
- Coordinates: 39°27′N 21°41′E
- Country: Greece
- Administrative region: Thessaly
- Regional unit: Trikala
- Municipality: Pyli

Area
  - Municipal unit: 58.5 km^{2} (22.6 sq mi)

Population (2021)
  - Municipal unit: 4,097
  - Municipal unit density: 70.0/km^{2} (181/sq mi)
  - Community: 818
- Time zone: UTC+2 (EET)
  - Summer (DST): UTC+3 (EEST)
- Vehicle registration: ΤΚ

Gomfoi (Greek: Γόμφοι, before 1930: Ραψίστα - Rapsista; Latin: Gomphi) is a village and a former municipality in the Trikala regional unit, Thessaly, Greece. Since the 2011 local government reform it is part of the municipality Pyli, of which it is a municipal unit. The municipal unit has an area of 58.482km^{2}. Population 4,097 (2021). The seat of the municipality was in Lygaria. Gomfoi is located in Thessalian Plain, near the river Pamisos. It is 5km northeast of Mouzaki, and 12km southwest of the city of Trikala. A town existed on the site of present Gomfoi in ancient times, which was renamed Philippoupolis (Greek: Φιλιππούπολις) during the reign of Philip II of Macedon. The area joined modern Greece in 1881.

== History ==
Ancient Gomfoi - Gomphi in classical sources - was a town of Histiaeotis in Ancient Thessaly, situated upon a tributary of the Peneius, and near the frontiers of Athamania and Dolopia. Its position made it a place of historical importance, since it guarded two of the chief passes into the Thessalian plains: "that of Musáki, distant two miles (three km), which was the exit from Dolopia, and the pass of Portes, at a distance of four miles (six km), which led into Athamania, and through that province to Ambracia."

In the war against Philip V of Macedon, Amynander of Athamania, king of the Athamanes, in co-operation with the Roman consul Titus Quinctius Flamininus, having descended from the latter pass, first took Pheca, a town lying between the pass and Gomphi, and then Gomphi itself, 198 BCE. The possession of this place was of great importance to Flamininus, since it secured him a communication with the Ambracian Gulf, from which he derived his supplies. The route from Gomphi to Ambracia is described by Livy as very short but extremely difficult. The capture of Gomphi was followed by the surrender of the towns named Argenta, Pherinium, Timarum, Ligynae, Strymon, and Lampsus, the position of which is quite uncertain. When Athamania revolted from Philip in 189 BCE, he marched into their country by the above-mentioned pass, but was obliged to retire with heavy loss. There can be no doubt that it was by the same route that the Roman consul Quintus Marcius Philippus marched from Ambracia into Thessaly in 169 BCE.

In the campaign between Julius Caesar and Pompey in 48 BCE, the inhabitants of Gomphi, having heard of Caesar's repulse at Dyrrhachium, shut their gates against him, when he arrived at the place from Aeginium; but he took the place by assault in a few hours. Caesar, in his account of these events, describes Gomphi as the "first town in Thessaly to those coming from Epirus." Coins minted at Gomphi survive. The Byzantine author Hierocles notes that Gomphi was a bishopric in later times.

== Subdivisions ==
The municipal unit Gomfoi is subdivided into the following communities:

- Drosero
- Gomfoi
- Lygaria
- Mouria
- Palaiomonastiro
- Pigi

After the start of Kallikratis programme, Municipality of Gomfoi was annexed by the Municipality of Pyli.

In the 2014 municipal elections, two of the four vice mayors elected (Stavros Ziakas and Viron Katsivelos) come from and live in Gomfoi. They are thought to be the more active members of the local government, as Vice-Mayor of Cleaning Operations and Vice-Mayor of Culture respectively.

== Population ==
Year	Community population	Municipality population
1981	1,207	-
1991	1,187	5,484
2001	1,096	5,154
2011	962	4,782
2021	818	4,097

== Economy ==
Most of the village's residents are either farmers or workers in the public sector. The area of Gomfoi is famous for its wine since the ancient years. The main agricultural products of the area are grapes and corn.

== See also ==
- List of settlements in the Trikala regional unit
