= Eudieru =

Coordinates: 39°55′47″N 22°24′56″E

Eudieru or Eudierum or Eudieron, also Dieron, was a fortified settlement or castle in Histiaeotis, in ancient Thessaly, on the southern side of Mount Olympus, described by Livy as distant 15 miles (24 km) from the Roman camp between Azorus and Doliche, in the direction of Ascuris and Lapathus.

Eudieru's site is tentatively located at Prophitis Elias.
