= Balla (Pieria) =

- Βάλλα (Ancient Greek)
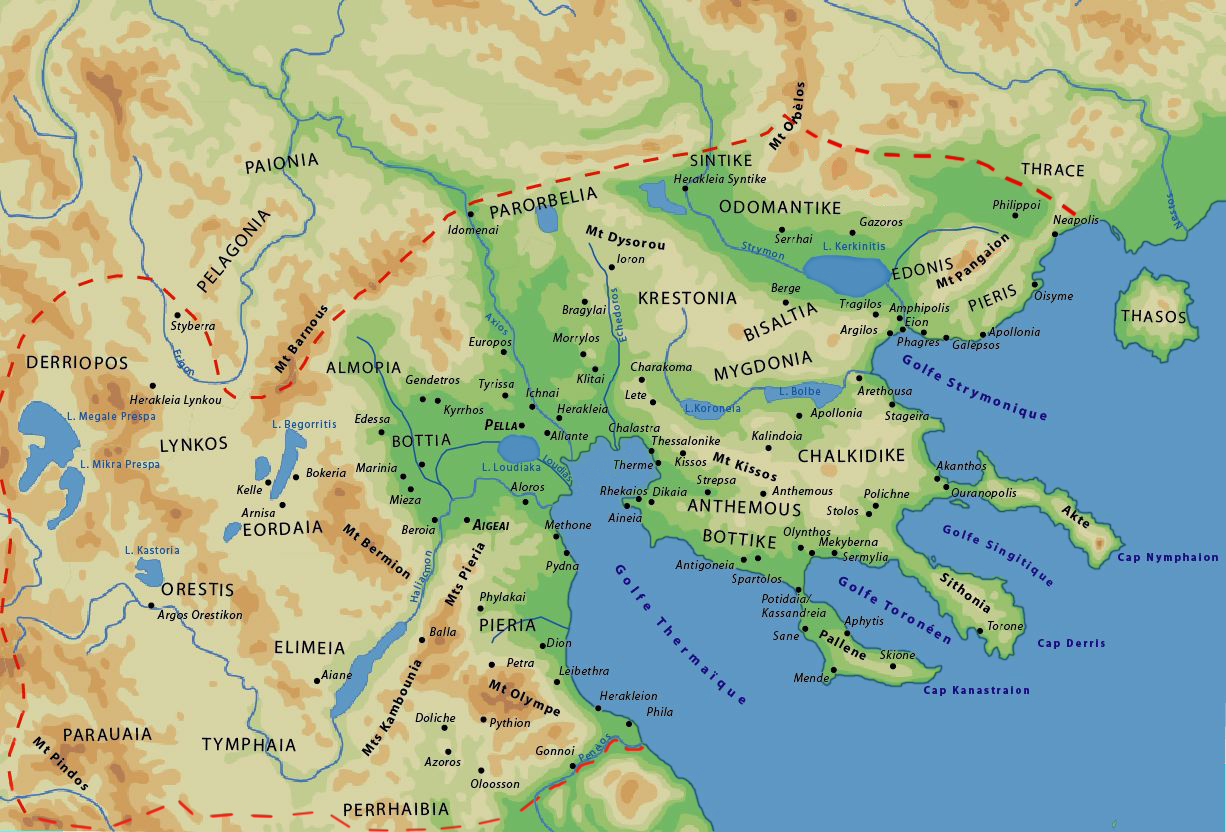
- Map of ancient Macedonia. The author of the map added an estimated location of Balla in Pieria (at the village of Palaiogratsianon) even though the true location remains in question.
- Interactive map of Balla
- 40.22°N 22.07°E

Balla (Ancient Greek: Βάλλα) or Valla (Οὐάλλαι) was a town of ancient Macedonia, on the Haliacmon river, south of Phylace, placed in Pieria by Ptolemy and Pliny, the inhabitants of which were removed to Pythium. As Pythium was in Perrhaebia, at the southwestern foot of the Pierian mountains, 19th century archaeologist William Martin Leake placed Balla in the mountainous part of Pieria, and supposed that Velventos may have derived its name from it. In that case it would be a different place from the "Bala" of the Peutinger Table, which stood about midway between Dium and Berrhoea.

Léon Heuzey misidentified the city of Aegae as Balla in the 1860s, a view that prevailed until 1976. Modern scholars treat its site as unlocated. One suggested location for the city is at the village of Palaiogratsianon.

== Bibliography ==
- The Macedonian State By N. G. L. Hammond pages 157, 385 ISBN 0-19-814927-1
