= Meliboea (Histiaeotis) =

Town in ancient Thessaly

Meliboea or Meliboia (Ancient Greek: Μελίβοια) was a town of Histiaeotis in ancient Thessaly. It was located near Aeginium and Tricca.

William Martin Leake conjectured that its site was at the present town of Vasiliki, and modern scholarship still leaves the site as unknown.

Abraham John Valpy suggested to read Livy as meaning the city known by Strabo as Melitoea and by Ptolemy as Melitara (now Militra) near Phthiotidis and Thessaliotidis, since Valpy was aware of Meliboea in Magnesia.
