= Mylae (Thessaly) =

Town in Ancient Greece

Coordinates: 39°44′30″N 22°05′17″E

Map showing ancient Thessaly. Mylae is shown in the upper centre northwest of Larissa.

Mylae (Ancient Greek: Μυλαί) was a town and polis (city-state) of Perrhaebia in ancient Thessaly. Livy described the battle for the town during the Third Macedonian War, in 171 BCE. The army of Perseus of Macedon, having obtained the surrender of Pythium, Azorus, and Doliche, and having taken Cyretiae, went against the city of Mylae, but it was very well fortified and resisted a siege for three days. On the fourth day, when the defenders were exhausted, the Macedonians launched a stronger attack against the city's defences but the defending Mylaens held them off long enough to counter attack. However, given the Mylaen numerical inferiority, the defence had to be abandoned. The Macedonians were able to penetrate through the breached defences and take the city. The Macedonians subsequently looted it, and sold it back to the survivors.

Mogens Herman Hansen identifies the site of Mylae as being just north of the modern town of Vlachogianni, while for others the identification with the Vlachogianni site is only tentative.
