= Androsthenes =

Androsthenes (Ancient Greek: Ἀνδροσθένης) was the name of a number of men in classical antiquity:

- Androsthenes of Thasos, an admiral of Alexander the Great
- Androsthenes of Cyzicus, a general of Antiochus III the Great
- Androsthenes of Corinth, a Greek general who fought the Romans
- Androsthenes of Thessaly, a general of Julius Caesar
- Androsthenes of Athens, a sculptor; see Praxias and Androsthenes
