= Onthyrion =

Onthyrion (Ancient Greek: Ὀνθύριον) was a town of Histiaeotis in ancient Thessaly. It was merged by synoecism into Metropolis.

It is unlocated.
