= Iresiae =

Iresiae or Iresiai was a town of ancient Thessaly. In the Second Macedonian War, Livy mentions that it was one of the cities devastated by Philip V of Macedon the year 198 BCE, together with Phacium, Euhydrium, Eretria and Palaepharsalus, since he foresaw that the territory would soon fall into the hands of the Aetolian League and the Romans. Philip allowed the men who were able to follow him, but they were compelled to quit their homes and the towns were burnt. All the property they could carry with them they were allowed to take away, the rest became the booty for the soldiers. The town was occupied by the Roman praetor Marcus Baebius Tamphilus in the war with Antiochus III in 191 BCE.

The site of Iresiae has not been securely located. In the 19th century, William Smith suggested that Livy's Iresiae may be a confusion for Peiresiae; however, modern scholars treat the town as distinct from Peiresiae and suggest the site is to be found in Magnesia not at Peiresiae.
