= Myle =

Myle may refer to:

- a Middle English alternative form of Mile
- Myle (Lycia), a town of ancient Lycia
- Myle (Cilicia), a town of ancient Cilicia
