= Euhydrium =

Town in the district of Thessaliotis in ancient Thessaly

Coordinates: 39°21′52″N 22°17′01″E

Euhydrium or Euhydrion (Greek: Ευύδριον or Εὐύδριον) was a town in the district of Thessaliotis in ancient Thessaly.

During the Second Macedonian War, Livy mentions it as one of the cities devastated by Philip V of Macedon the year 198 BCE, together with Phacium, Iresiae, Eretria and Palaepharsalus, since he foresaw that the territory would soon fall into the hands of the Aetolian League and the Romans. Philip allowed the men who were able to follow him, but they were compelled to quit their homes and the towns were burnt. All the property they could carry with them they were allowed to take away, the rest became the booty for the soldiers.

The site of Euhydrium is at the modern village of Ktouri.
