= Cierium =

Town and polis in ancient Thessaly

Coordinates: 39°22′00″N 22°03′59″E

Map showing ancient Thessaly. Cierium is shown to the lower centre.

Cierium or Kierion (Ancient Greek: Κιέριον) was a town and polis (city-state) in the district of Thessaliotis in ancient Thessaly, which according to some ancient commentators, such as Stephanus of Byzantium was the successor to the Homeric Arne, the chief town of the Aeolian Boeotians in Thessaly, from which they emigrated to Boeotia.

== History ==
According to Thucydides, the Boeotians had occupied the territory of Boeotia when, sixty years after the Trojan War, they had been expelled from the city of Arne by the Thessalians. Archemachus of Euboea and other authors add that only a few Boeotians decided to stay in Arne and remain as servants of the Thessalians and were called penestae. Stephanus of Byzantium identified this Arne located in Thessaly with the city of Cierium, which was accepted by William Smith, writing in the 19th century, and by some current researchers, others place Arne at Magoula Makria. a site nearby, but not at, Cierium.

In the Second Macedonian War, in the year 198 BCE after the capture of Phaloria by Roman troops and their allies, the cities of Cierium and of Metropolis sent embassies that offered the surrender of their cities and thus obtained clemency.

In the Roman–Seleucid War, Cieriumwas taken by the army of Antiochus III the Great, together with Metropolis and adjacent fortresses. Shortly thereafter Roman consul Manius Acilius Glabrio, in his advance through Thessalian territory, received delegates from the cities of Metropolis and Cierium that again, as in the Second Macedonian War, offered to surrender their cities shortly before the Battle of Thermopylae.

The site of Cierium is in the modern village of Pyrgos Kieriou (Πύργος Κιερίου), in the municipal unit of Arni, municipality of Sofades, periphery of Karditsa, Thessaly.

== Rediscovery and situation ==
The site of Cierium was first discovered by William Martin Leake, who from inscriptions and coins found on the spot has proved that it was sited by the modern villages of Pyrgos Kieriou and Mataragka (Ματαράγκα), between the Enipeus or Apidanus, and a tributary of that river. The territory of Cierium adjoined that of Metropolis; and we learn from an inscription cited by Leake that the adjustment of their boundaries was a frequent subject of discussion between the two people. William Smith cites as evidence of the identification of Arne with Cierium an inscription, which mentions Poseidon Cuerius (Κουέριος), a name evidently connected with the river Cuarius or Coralius in Boeotia. The expelled Boeotians gave this name to the river, and founded upon its banks a temple of Athena Itonia in memory of their former abode in Thessaly. Smith concludes that the river upon which Cierium stood was called Cuerius, Cuarius or Curalius, more especially as Strabo mentions a river Curalius in Thessaly, flowing through the territory of Pharcadon in Histiaeotis past the temple of Athena Itonia into the Peneius; in which the only inaccuracy appears to be that he makes it flow directly into the Peneius. Pausanias also appears to speak of this temple of Athena Itonia, since he describes it as situated between Pherae and Larissa, which is sufficient to indicate the site of Cierium. Leake supposes with much probability that the name of Arne may have been disused by the Thessalian conquerors because it was of Boeotian origin, and that the new appellation may have been taken from the neighbouring river, since it was not an uncommon custom to derive the name of a town from the river upon which it stood.

Cierium is not mentioned under this name in history; but it occurs under the form Pierium, which is undoubtedly only another appellation of the same place, π and κ being, according to Smith, often interchangeable. Pierium was probably the general, and Cierium the local form. Pierium is first mentioned by Thucydides. It is called Piera and Pieria by Livy, in both of which passages it is mentioned in connection with Metropolis. In an Armenian translation of Eusebius we find the name of Amyntas of Pieria in the list of the strategoi who governed Thessaly after the Battle of Cynoscephalae (197 BCE). Claudius Aelianus speaks of Pierus in Thessaly.
