= Silana (Thessaly) =

Silana was a town in the Histiaeotis in the northwest of ancient Thessaly, near the frontiers of Athamania, mentioned along with Gomphi and Tricca by Livy.

Its site remains unlocated.
