= Metropolis (Thessaly) =

Town and polis (city-state) in ancient Thessaly

Coordinates: 39°20′13″N 21°49′57″E

Map showing ancient Thessaly. Metropolis is shown in the west centre south of Ithome.

Metropolis (Ancient Greek: Μητρόπολις) was a town and polis (city-state) of Histiaeotis (or of Thessaliotis) in ancient Thessaly, described by Stephanus of Byzantium as a town in Upper Thessaly. Strabo says that Metropolis was founded by three insignificant towns, but that a larger number was afterwards added, among which was Ithome. He further says, that Ithome was within a quadrangle, formed by the four cities Tricca, Metropolis, Pelinnaeum, and Gomphi. The position of Metropolis is also determined by its being on Caesar's march from Gomphi to Pharsalus.

Livy relates how the town repulsed an attack by the Aetolians after the retreat of Philip V of Macedon (198 BCE). Whilst the Aetolians were devastating the fields round Metropolis the townsmen who had mustered in force to defend their walls inflicted a repulse upon them. The Aetolians then continued on to attack nearby Callithera. It was taken by Titus Quinctius Flamininus on his descending into this part of Thessaly, after the Battle of the Aous.

We learn from an inscription that the territory of Metropolis adjoined that of Cierium (the ancient Arne), and that the adjustment of their boundaries was a frequent subject of discussion between the two peoples. Metropolis is mentioned in the sixth century by Hierocles. The remains of Metropolis are at the small village about 5 miles (8.0 km) southwest of Karditsa formerly called Paleokastro, but since renamed Mitropoli (Μητρόπολη) to reflect its association with the historic town.

The city was of a circular form, and in the centre of the circle are the vestiges of a circular citadel, part of the wall of which still exists in the yard of the village church, where is a collection of the sculptured or inscribed remains found upon the spot. Among other sculptures noticed by William Martin Leake during his visit in the early nineteenth century, one in low relief, representing a figure seated upon a rock, in long drapery, and a mountain rising in face of the figure, at the foot of which there is a man in a posture of adoration, while on the top of the mountain there are other men, one of whom holds a hog in his hands. Leake conjectured with great probability that the seated figure represents the Aphrodite of Metropolis, to whom Strabo says that hogs were offered in sacrifice.

Metropolis minted silver coins dated to c. 400-344 BCE bearing the legends «ΜΗΤΡΟΠΟ[ΛΙΤΩΝ]» and «ΜΗΤΡΟΠΟΛ».
