= Phaloria =

Coordinates: 39°50′48″N 21°31′20″E

Map showing ancient Thessaly. Phaloria is shown to the centre left near western boundary of Thessaly.

Phaloria or Phaloreia (Ancient Greek: Φαλώρεια) or Phalore (Φαλώρη) was a town and polis (city-state) of Histiaeotis in ancient Thessaly, apparently between Tricca and the Macedonian frontier.

In the Second Macedonian War, in 198 BCE, Roman troops and their allies under command of Titus Quinctius Flamininus upon their entry into Thessaly, attacked Phaloria, which was defended by 2,000 Macedonians who resisted for a time but due to the tenacious perseverance of the Romans, day and night, the city was captured and, later, set afire and looted. This prompted the nearby cities of Cierium and of Metropolis to send embassies offering to surrender of their cities.

During the Roman–Seleucid War, it was one of the Thessalian cities in the year 191 BCE, being held by Athamanians, was taken by a joint army of the Roman Marcus Baebius Tamphilus and Philip V of Macedon.

Bronze coins have been found that were minted by the city of Phaloria at least from the end of the 4th century or the beginning of the 3rd century BCE.

The site of Phaloria has tentatively been accepted at a place near Meritsa.
