= Mylai =

Mylai may refer to:

- Mylai (Cilicia), a town of ancient Cilicia, now in Turkey
- Mylai (Sicily), a city of ancient Sicily, Italy
- Mylai (Thessaly), a town of ancient Thesssaly, Greece
- a place in the Sơn Tịnh District, Vietnam, scene of a notorious massacre

"Mylai", a short form of Mylapore, a heritage locality in Chennai, India
