= Acharne =

Acharne may refer to:

- Acharne, Greece, a suburb of Athens
- Acharrae, an ancient town of Thessaly
