= Apame =

Apame or APAME may refer to:

- Apame IV, princess from the Antigonid dynasty
- Apame, concubine of Darius I

== See also ==
- Apama (disambiguation)
- Apamea (disambiguation)
