= Phacium =

Phakion (Ancient Greek: Φάκιον, Latin Phacium) was a settlement and possible polis (city-state) of ancient Thessaly.

Brasidas and his Spartan troops camped at Phakion in 424 BCE. In the Second Macedonian War, Livy mentions that it was one of the settlements (oppida) devastated by Philip V of Macedon the year 198 BCE, together with Iresiae (Peirasia?), Euhydrium, Eretria and Palaepharsalus, since he foresaw that the territory would soon fall into the hands of the Aetolian League and the Romans. Philip allowed the men who were able to follow him, but they were compelled to quit their homes and the towns were burnt. All the property they could carry with them they were allowed to take away, the rest became the booty for the soldiers. The settlement was occupied by the Roman praetor Marcus Baebius Tamphilus in the war with Antiochus III in 191 BCE.

The site of Phakion has not been securely located; some scholars suggest a site on left bank of the Peneius river (at Klokotos), or further to the south by the Enipeus at Vlochos.
