= Atrax (Thessaly) =

Perrhaebian town in ancient Thessaly

Coordinates: 39°34′12″N 22°11′30″E

Map showing ancient Thessaly. Atrax is shown to the west of Larissa.

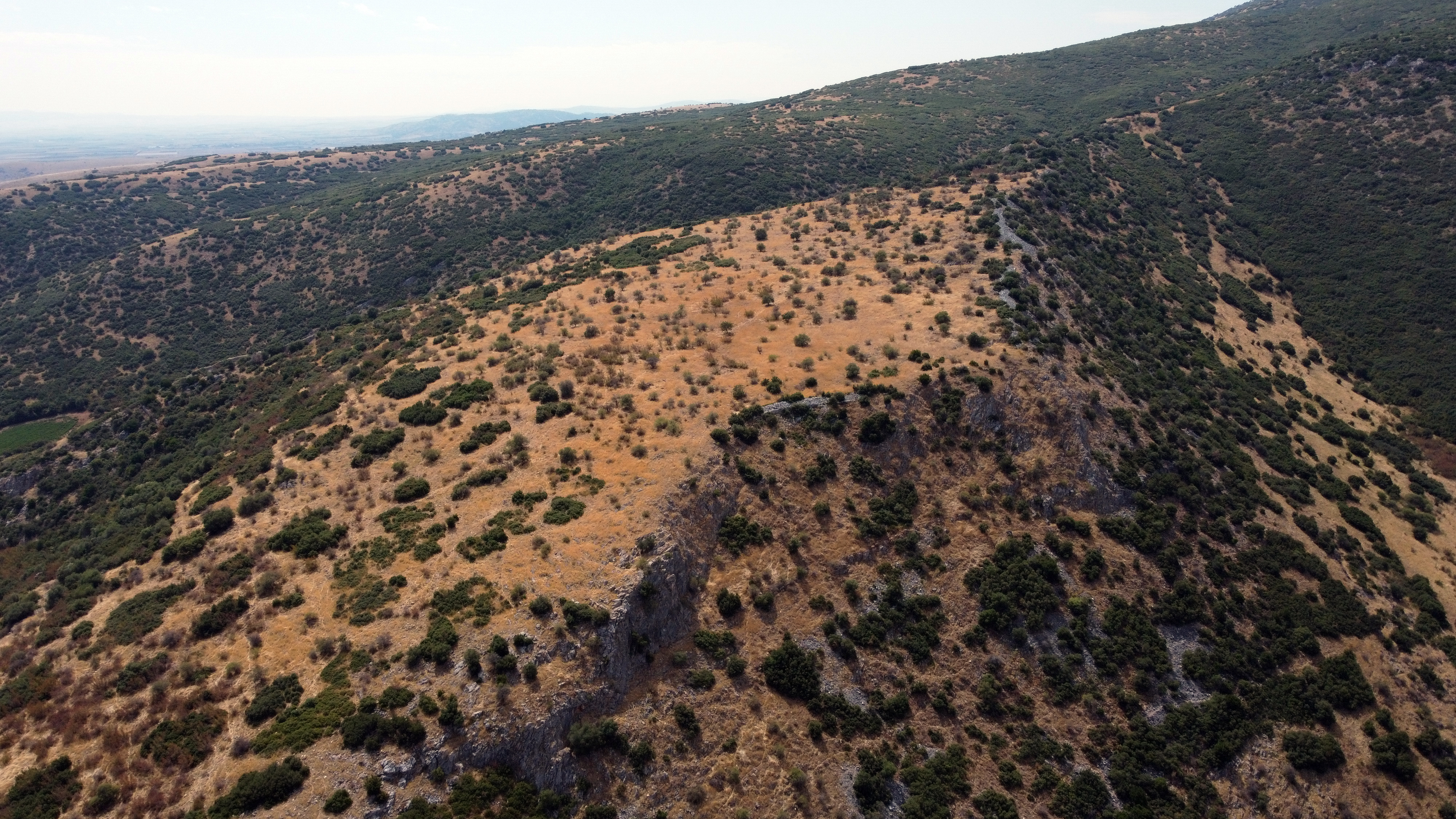
Acropolis of ancient Atrax in Pelasgiotis

Atrax (Ancient Greek: Ἄτραξ, or Ἄτραγος or Ἄτρακοϛ) or Atracia (Ἀτρακία) was a Perrhaebian town in ancient Thessaly, described by Livy as situated above the river Peneius, at the distance of about 10 miles (16 km) from Larissa. Strabo says that the Peneius passed by the cities of Tricca, Pelinnaeum and Pharcadon, on its left, on its course to Atrax and Larissa. The town is attested as Ἆδρακος in the nominative in a catalog of theorodokoi of Epidaurus, dating from 363-359 BCE. It was also a polis (city-state) in antiquity.

According to tradition it was founded by Atrax (mythology) and named after him.

== History ==
The town was located in the district of Pelasgiotis and its territory was bordered on the north by Phalanna, the northeast by Argura, and to the south by Crannon.

In the 5th century BCE, the acropolis and the slope of the hill were enclosed in a polygonal enclosure. In the 4th century BCE the acropolis was rebuilt: a quadrangular tower was built and fortified with a new wall with five towers, one of them with a fortified gate. The eastern part of the wall of the hill was reinforced in the 4th century BCE, And bears similarity to the defensive constructions of Halos. The lower part was enclosed in the 4th century BCE by an opus isodomum wall with four quadrangular towers. It was 3 kilometres (1.9 mi) long and surrounded an area of 64 hectares (160 acres). The main gate was in the northwest, and was accessed by a polygonal stone ramp.

During the food crisis of 330-326 BCE Atrax received 10,000 medimnoi of wheat from Cyrene, in Africa.

Atrax still minted silver and bronze coins at the beginning of the 4th century BCE, With the legends «ΑΤΡΑ», «ΑΤΡΑΓΙΟΝ», and «ΑΤΡΑΓΙΩΝ». The famous Atrakian marble that was widely used in antiquity, among others in the Hagia Sophia, did not come from Atrax itself, but in Mount Mopsion further east.

In Byzantine times, the city's fortifications were extended with a mortar wall to the Peneius, in order to improve water supply. The fortress served to control of the passage between the eastern and western halves of the Thessalian plain.

== Location ==
Modern scholars locate Atrax at a site known as Kastro or Alifaka, near the modern village of Koutsochero (Greek: Κουτσόχερο), in the municipal unit of Koilada, in the municipality of Larissa. Most ancient and medieval structures have vanished in recent times, being removed by the locals to utilize the land for agriculture.
