= Melivoia =

Melivoia (Greek: Μελίβοια) may refer to the following places in Greece:

- Melivoia, Larissa, a village in Larissa
- Melivoia, Xanthi, a village in Xanthi

== See also ==
- Meliboea (disambiguation)
