= Cypaera =

Coordinates: 39°04′44″N 22°08′17″E

Cypaera or Kypaira (Ancient Greek: Κύπαιρα) or Cyphara or Cyphaera (Κύφαιρα) was a town and polis (city-state) of Ancient Thessaly, in the southern part of the district Thessaliotis or Phthiotis, near the confines of Dolopia. Livy relates that the retreat of Philip V of Macedon after the Battle of the Aous (198 BC) allowed the Aetolians to occupy much of Thessaly, and these latter, after sacking Xyniae took Cypaera. It has been located at a site called Palaia Yannitsou within the territory between the modern villages of Kaitsa (Λουτρά Καΐτσης) and Makrirrachi (Μακρυρράχη), in the municipal unit of Xyniada.
