= Titanus (disambiguation) =

Titanus is an Italian film production company.

Titanus may also refer to:

- Titanus giganteus, the titan beetle
- Dorcus titanus, the giant stag beetle
- Titanus the Carrierzord, a zord from Mighty Morphin Power Rangers
- Titanus (city), a city mentioned in the Iliad's Catalogue of Ships
- Mount Titanus, a mountain near the ancient town of Asterium
