= Amynander =

Amynander is a given name. Notable people with the name include:

- Amynander of Athamania, a king of the Athamanes in south Epirus c. 200 BC
- Amynander, a character in Timaeus, one Plato's dialogues
