= Eretria (disambiguation) =

Eretria is an ancient city in Greece.

Eretria may also refer to:

- Eretria (moth), a genus of moth
- Eretria (Shannara), a character in the Shannara series of fantasy novels
- Eretria (Thessaly), a town of ancient Thessaly, Greece
