= List of populated places whose identities come from Philip II of Macedon =

This is a list of cities, towns and fortresses founded or renamed and repopulated by Philip II of Macedon.

- Philippi
- Heraclea Lyncestis
- Heraclea Sintica
- Philippopolis (Thessaly)
- Philippopolis (Thracia)
