= Cyretiae =

Town and polis (city-state) of Perrhaebia in ancient Thessaly

Coordinates: 39°46′34″N 22°07′20″E

Map showing ancient Thessaly. Alope is shown to the top center, north of Mylae.

Cyretiae or Chyretiai or Kyretiai (Greek: Χυρετίαι) was a town and polis (city-state) of Perrhaebia in ancient Thessaly, frequently mentioned in the Roman wars in Greece. It was plundered by the Aetolians in 200 BCE, was taken by Antiochus III, 191 BCE, but recovered by Marcus Baebius Tamphilus and Philip V of Macedon in the same year, and was attacked by Perseus of Macedon, following the surrender of nearby Doliche, Pythium, and Azorus in 171 BCE. In the last event, after a first assault attempt was repulsed, the attackers on the second day of the siege obtained the surrender of the defenders.

Cyretiae appears in several inscriptions that have come down to us, among which stand out: one dated between 375-350 BCE, containing a joint dedication to Apollo of the cities of Perrhaebia, a letter from Titus Quinctius Flamininus to the Cyretiaeans that can be dated to 195 BCE, and a decree of proxeny dated to 191 BCE that contains the names of several tagoi.

Cyretiae is located at a site in the modern village of Domeniko. Its acropolis occupied the hill, on which now stands the church of St. George, and excavations have been undertaken.
