= Lapathus =

Lapathus or Lapathos (ancient Greek: Λάπαθος) may refer to:

- Lapathus (Cyprus), a town of ancient Cyprus
- Lapathus (Thessaly), a town of ancient Thessaly, Greece
- Lapathos, Cyprus, a village in modern Cyprus
- Lapathus (mythology), a Greek mythological figure, legendary founder of Lapathus (Cyprus)
