= Damasi =

Damasi may refer to:

- Damës, Gjirokastër, Albania
- Damasi, Larissa, Greece
