= Azoros =

Azoros Άζωρος
- Community
- Location within Greece
- Coordinates: 40°0′N 22°4.7′E
- Country: Greece
- Administrative region: Thessaly
- Regional unit: Larissa
- Municipality: Elassona
- Municipal unit: Sarantaporo

Area
  - Community: 20.308 km^{2} (7.841 sq mi)
- Elevation: 520 m (1,710 ft)

Population (2021)
  - Community: 256
  - Density: 12.6/km^{2} (32.6/sq mi)
- Time zone: UTC+2 (EET)
  - Summer (DST): UTC+3 (EEST)
- Postal code: 402 00
- Area code: +30-2493
- Vehicle registration: PI

Azoros (Greek: Άζωρος, Greek pronunciation: ['azoɾos]) is a village and a community of the Elassona municipality in the Larissa regional unit. Before the 2011 local government reform it was a part of the municipality of Sarantaporo, of which it was a municipal district. The community of Azoros covers an area of 20.308 km^{2}.

== Geography ==
Azoros is built at an altitude of 520 meters at the foot of Mount Amarbeis, at a distance of 18 kilometers from Elassona, near the ruins of the ancient thessalian city of Azorus.

Near the city flows the river Titarisios, an important tributary of the Pineios. There are also natural springs in the nearby areas of Tsouknida, Tsimpitoura and Tsimpitoroula (Greek: Τσουκνίδα, Τσιμπιτούρα, Τσιμπιτορούλα).

Mount Olympus, the highest mountain in Greece, is situated about 25km Northeast of Azoros.

== History ==
The ancient citadel of Azoros and the walls of the Hellenistic and mid-Byzantine period are situated Southeast of the town, on the hill named "Kastri".

The area was controlled by the Byzantine Empire, until 1420 when Turahan Bey, an Ottoman military Commander, conquered the mountainous Perrhaebia.

Until 1991 the town was called Vouvala or Vuvala (Βουβάλα), but was renamed to reflect the ancient city of Azorus which is located within the community. The town was liberated by the Greek Army during the Balkan Wars and was extensively destroyed during the Axis occupation of Greece and the Greek Civil War.

== Economy ==
The population of Azoros is occupied in animal husbandry and agriculture.

== Population ==
Historical population
Year	Pop.	±%
1928	484	—
1940	619	+27.9%
1951	681	+10.0%
1961	739	+8.5%
1971	608	−17.7%
1981	529	−13.0%
1991	724	+36.9%
2001	499	−31.1%
2011	333	−33.3%
2021	256	−23.1%

== Culture ==
The main events of the village take place on January 7 (procession from the Olympiotissa monastery), July 26 (Feast of St. Paraskevi) and Clean Monday with the custom of representing a traditional wedding attract visitors to the area.

== See also ==
- List of settlements in the Larissa regional unit
