= Sykies, Karditsa =

Sykies Συκιές
- Community
- Location within Greece
- Coordinates: 39°29′04″N 22°11′38″E
- Country: Greece
- Administrative region: Thessaly
- Regional unit: Karditsa
- Municipality: Palamas
- Municipal unit: Fyllo

Population (2021)
  - Community: 221
- Time zone: UTC+2 (EET)
  - Summer (DST): UTC+3 (EEST)
- Vehicle registration: ΚΑ

Sykies (Greek: Συκιές), formerly Sykeai (Συκέαι), is a community and village in the municipal unit of Fyllo, municipality of Palamas, periphery of Karditsa, Thessaly, Greece. As of the census of 2021, the community had a population of 221. The community has two villages, Sykies and Magoulitsa (Μαγουλίτσα). Within the bounds of Sykies is the site of the ancient city of Asterium.
