= Talares =

The Talares (Ancient Greek: Τάλαρες) were a Molossian people of ancient Epirus, extinct in the time of Strabo. Their capital was probably Oxyneia.
