= Celathara =

Celathara was a town of Ancient Thessaly. Livy relates that the retreat of Philip V of Macedon after the Battle of the Aous (198 BC) allowed the Aetolians to occupy much of Thessaly, and these latter plundered Celathara and nearby Theuma, whereas Acharrae surrendered.
