= Theuma (Thessaly) =

Theuma was a town of Ancient Thessaly near the frontiers of Dolopia. Livy relates that the retreat of Philip V of Macedon after the Battle of the Aous (198 BC) allowed the Aetolians to occupy much of Thessaly, and these latter plundered Theuma and nearby Celathara, whereas Acharrae surrendered.
