= Pialia =

Coordinates: 39°37′35″N 21°37′16″E

Map showing ancient Thessaly. Phaeca is shown to the centre left near Mount Cercetium.

Pialia (Ancient Greek: Πιαλία) or Pialeia (Πιάλεια) was a town of Histiaeotis in ancient Thessaly, at the foot of Mount Cercetium.

The location of Pialia is at a place called Skoumbos.
