= Apama (disambiguation) =

Apama may refer to:

== Nature ==
- Apama, a synonym of the flowering plant genus Thottea
- Sepia apama, a species of the Australian giant cuttlefish
- For the tree in South America, see Tabebuia rosea

== People ==
Apama sometimes spelled Apame for a woman and Apammes for a man, is an ancient and modern name of Persian origin. The name can refer to:

- Apama, daughter of the admirable Bartacus and concubine of King Darius I of Persia
- Apama, daughter of Artaxerxes II of Persia and wife of Pharnabazus
- Apama, sometimes known as Apama I or Apame I, first Queen of the Seleucid Empire
- Apama, daughter of Seleucus I Nicator and Apama I
- Apama II, a Seleucid Princess and one of the daughters of Antiochus I Soter and Stratonice of Syria
- Apama, one of the daughters of Antiochus II Theos and Laodice I
- Apama III, niece of Apama II, daughter of Demetrius II Aetolicus and Stratonice of Macedon
- Apama IV sometimes known as Apame IV, a princess whose father was Philip V of Macedon and brother was Perseus of Macedon
- Apama, daughter of Alexander of Megalopolis who married Amynander of Athamania
- Apama Popat, an Indian athlete who participated at the 2000 Sydney Olympics, see Great Britain at the 2000 Summer Olympics

== Technology ==
- Apama Real-time Analytics, a Complex Event Processing product from Software AG

== See also ==
- Apamea (disambiguation)
- Apame (disambiguation)
