= Isidore of Charax =

Greco-Roman geographer of the 1st centuries BCE and CE

Isidore of Charax (/ˈɪzɪˌdɔːr/; Ancient Greek: Ἰσίδωρος ὁ Χαρακηνός, Isídōros o Charakēnós; Latin: Isidorus Characenus) was a Greek geographer of the 1st century BC and 1st century AD, a citizen of the Parthian Empire, about whom nothing is known but his name and that he wrote at least one work.

== Name ==
Isidore's name has been interpreted by editor and translator W.H. Schoff to indicate that he was from the city of Charax in Characene on the northern end of the present Persian Gulf. However, the Greek charax merely means "palisade" and there were several fortified towns that bore the name (see Charax).

== Parthian Stations ==
Isidore's best known work is "The Parthian Stations" (Ancient Greek: Σταθμοί Παρθικοί, Stathmœ́ Parthicœ́; Latin: Mansiones Parthicae), an itinerary of the overland trade route from Antioch to India along the caravan stations maintained by the Arsacid Empire. He seems to have given his distances in schoeni ("ropes") of debated value. Isidore must have written it some time after 26 BC, for it refers to the revolt of Tiridates II against Phraates IV, which occurred in that year.

In its surviving form, "The Parthian Stations" appears to be a summary from some larger work. A reference in Athenaeus suggests that the title of the greater work was A Journey around Parthia (τὸ τῆς Παρθίας περιηγητικόν, tò tês Parthías periēgēticón). Athenaeus's reference, not included in the present text of "The Parthian Stations", is a description of pearl fishing.

The 1st-century historiographer Pliny the Elder refers to a "description of the world" commissioned by the Emperor Augustus "to gather all necessary information in the east when his eldest son was about to set out for Armenia to take the command against the Parthians and Arabians"; this occurred c. 1 BC. Pliny refers to the author as a "Dionysius", but it is assumed by Schoff that this is a mistake and Isidore was meant. It is Isidore who is cited for the relevant measurements of geographic distances.

The 2nd-century satirist Lucian of Samosata also cites an Isidore (although not necessarily this one) for claims of longevity. Lucian does not note the name of the work he is quoting.

A collection of translations of the various fragments attributed to Isidore of Charax were published with commentary in "The Parthian Stations", a forty-six-page booklet by Wilfred Harvey Schoff in 1914. The Greek text in that volume is that established by Karl Müller.
