= Phylace (Pieria) =

Phylace or Phylake (Ancient Greek: Φυλακή or Φμλάκη, Phylakē), or Phylaces or Phylakes (Φυλακές, Phylakēs), or Phylacae or Phylakai (Φυλακαὶ, Phylakaí), was a city in mountainous ancient Pieria, Macedon, on the Haliacmon river, north of Balla. Parmenion, son of Glaucias, Phylacean (Greek: Παρμενίων Γλαυκίου Φυλακαῖος) was a dolichos runner and winner in the Alexandrian games at Beroea in 3rd or 2nd century BCE (dedicated to Alexander the Great). Pliny mentions the inhabitants under the name Phylacaei.

Its site is unlocated.
