= Gonnocondylus =

Town in ancient Greece

Coordinates: 39°51′18″N 22°29′46″E

Gonnocondylus or Gonnocondylum, also called Olympias (Ancient Greek: Ὀλυμπίας), was a town in ancient Thessaly. The town was renamed Olympias by Philip V of Macedon prior to 185 BCE, when the Perrhaebians requested the return of the town, along with Malloea and Ericinium.

Its site is located at Tsourba Mandra.
