= Malloea =

Town and polis of Perrhaebia, Ancient Thessaly

Coordinates: 39°51′03″N 22°04′51″E

Map showing ancient Thessaly. Malloea is shown to the upper centre near Mylae.

Malloea or Maloea or Mallaea or Malloia (Ancient Greek: Μαλλοία) was a town and polis (city-state) of southern Perrhaebia in ancient Thessaly. It is quoted by Livy that the town surrendered to the army of Aetolian League in 200 BCE. Again, during the Roman-Seleucid War, it was seized by an army of Aetolians under Menippus in 191 BCE. and shortly afterward it was attacked by the army of Philip V of Macedon. Upon the arrival of Roman troops, who were then allies of Philip, Malloea surrendered. In 185 BCE, the Perrhaebians requested the return of Malloea, Ericinium and Gonnocondylum, which Philip had renamed Olympias. In 171 BCE, during the Third Macedonian War, the town was taken and looted by the Romans.

The site of Malloea is at the paleokastro (old fort) near Margara, a site in the community of Sykia.
