= Acharrae =

Town and polis (city-state) of Ancient Thessaly

Coordinates: 39°08′42″N 22°11′59″E

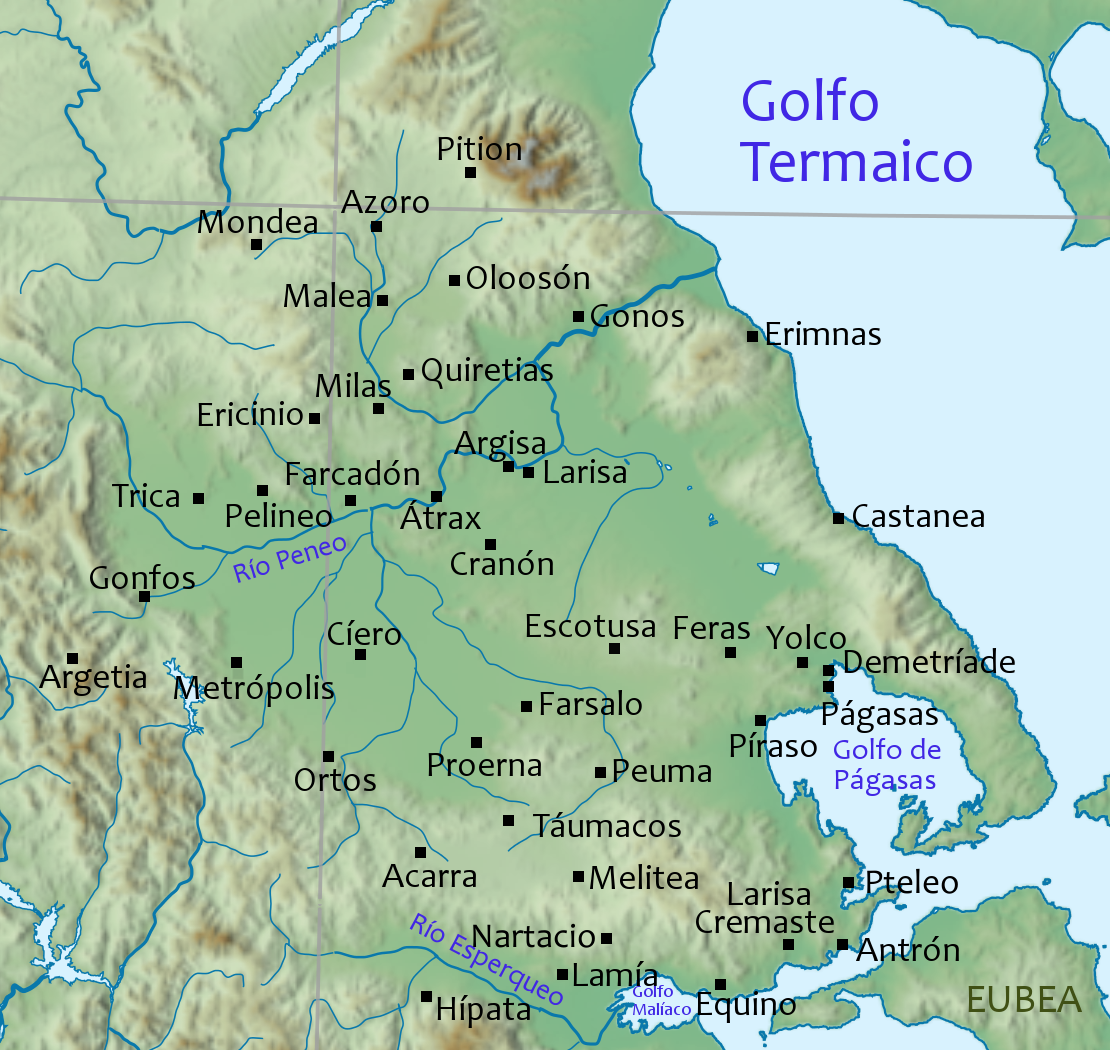
Map showing the principal cities of ancient Thessaly and adjacent areas. Acharrae (written as Acarra) is shown to the south. Note: the map is in Spanish.

Acharrae (Ancient Greek: Ἀκαρρα) was a town and polis (city-state) of Ancient Thessaly in the district Thessaliotis or Phthiotis, on the river Pamisus, mentioned only by Livy, but apparently the same place as the Acharne of Pliny. Livy relates that the retreat of Philip V of Macedon after the Battle of the Aous (198 BC) allowed the Aetolians to occupy much of Thessaly, and these latter gained Acharrae by surrender, whereas nearby Theuma and Celathara were plundered.

Acharrae minted bronze coins at least from the fourth century BC with the inscription «ΕΚΚΑΡΡΕΩΝ».
