= Tripolis (Perrhaebia) =

Tripolis (Greek: Τρίπολις; meaning "three cities") was a district in ancient Perrhaebia, Thessaly, Greece, containing the three cities of Azorus, Pythion (Pythium), and Doliche. (Livy, xlii. 53.)
