= Anthemusias =

Coordinates: 36°45′56″N 37°59′00″E

Anthemusias (Greek: Ανθεμουσιάς) or Charax Sidae was an ancient Mesopotamian town, according to Pliny and Strabo. Isidore of Charax says that it was 8 schoeni from Apamea near the Euphrates on the road to Seleucia, and Ptolemy places it “at the foot of a mountain called Caspius".

The city was founded by one of the early Seleucids and, according to Ptolemy, was situated next to Apameia.

"Tiridates meanwhile, with the consent of the Parthians, received the submission of Nicephorium, Anthemusias and the other cities, which having been founded by Macedonians, claim Greek names, also of the Parthian towns Halus and Artemita. There was a rivalry of joy among the inhabitants who detested Artabanus, bred as he had been among the Scythians, for his cruelty, and hoped to find in Tiridates a kindly spirit from his Roman training."

This conquest by Tiridates III in 35 CE over Artabanus II was short-lived as Artabanus soon returned from Hyrcania with an army of Dahae Scythians. However, he was forced to accept a treaty with the Lucius Vitellius, the Roman governor of Syria, in 37CE, in which he gave up all power.
