= Oxyneia =

Map showing ancient Thessaly. Oxyneia is shown to the upper left.

Oxyneia or Oxynia (Ancient Greek: Ὀξύνεια), or Oxynium or Oxynion (Ὀξύνιον), was a town and polis (city-state) of ancient Thessaly, situated on the Ion, a tributary of the Peneius, and perhaps the capital of the Talares. It is described by Strabo as distant 120 stadia from Azorus.

It is cited as a place that provided a theorodokos to Epidaurus in 359 BCE.

Its site in unknown. It has traditionally been located in old Meritsa, which is currently called Oxyneia but that location does not seem to be compatible with Strabo's description, like another suggested location Nea Smolia. Another place where it has been suggested that it could have been and that fits more with Strabo's data is a hill near Dasochori.
