= Meliboea (disambiguation) =

Meliboea or Meliboia (ancient Greek: Μελίβοια) was the name of a number of Greek mythological figures.

Meliboea or Meliboia may also refer to:

- 137 Meliboea, an asteroid
- Meliboea (Histiaeotis), a town in Histiaeotis district, ancient Thessaly, Greece
- Meliboea (Magnesia), a town in Magnesia district, ancient Thessaly, Greece
