= Philip of Megalopolis =

Philip (Ancient Greek: Φίλιππος) was son of Alexander of Megalopolis.

His father's pretended descent from Alexander the Great appears to have filled him with the most puerile schemes of ambition. On the marriage of his sister Apama with Amynander of Athamania, Philip accompanied her, and contrived to obtain great influence over the mind of Amynander, who gave him the government of Zacynthus, and allowed him to direct in great measure the administration of affairs. At the outbreak of the Roman-Seleucid War Amynander called his cognate to join him in Athamania, and Philip handed the island over to Hierocles of Agrigentum, who later betrayed it to the Achaeans.

When Antiochus III came into Greece (192 BC) he gained over Philip to his interests by pretending to regard him as the rightful heir to the Macedonian throne, and even holding out to him hopes of establishing him upon it; by which means he obtained the adherence of Amynander also. Philip was afterwards chosen by Antiochus for the duty of burying the bones of the Macedonians and Greeks slain at the Battle of Cynoscephalae, a measure by which he vainly hoped to conciliate popularity. He was next appointed to command the garrison at Pellinaeum, but was soon compelled to surrender to the Romans, by whom he was sent a prisoner to Rome. When first taken captive he accidentally met Philip V of Macedon, who in derision greeted him with the royal title.
