= Charax (Media Atropatene) =

Charax (Ancient Greek: Χάραξ) was an ancient place of the Cadusii people, in Cadusia, Media Atropatene on the Caspian Sea, north of Cyropolis.
