= Manthos Falagas =

Greek footballer

Personal information
- Full name: Mattheos Falagas
- Date of birth: 24 January 1992 (age 34)
- Place of birth: Palamas, Karditsa, Greece
- Height: 1.82 m (5 ft 11 1/2 in)
- Position: Striker

Team information
- Current team: Anagennisi Karditsa F.C.
- Number: 45

Senior career*
Years	Team	Apps	(Gls)
2009–2010	Anagennisi Karditsa F.C.	6	(0)
2010–2012	AEL	2	(0)
2012	Anagennisi Karditsa F.C.		
- * Club domestic league appearances and goals

Mattheos 'Manthos' Falagas (born 24 January 1992 in Palamas, Karditsa) is a football forward who currently plays for Anagennisi Karditsa F.C.in the Football League 2, the third Greek national football division. He started his career as a professional with A.S.A., in 2009. On 19 August 2010, he signed a five-year contract with Football League club AEL. On 31 January 2012 he returned to his hometown team, as a free transfer.
