= Phyllus =

City in ancient Greece

Phyllos
- Φύλλος (Ancient Greek)
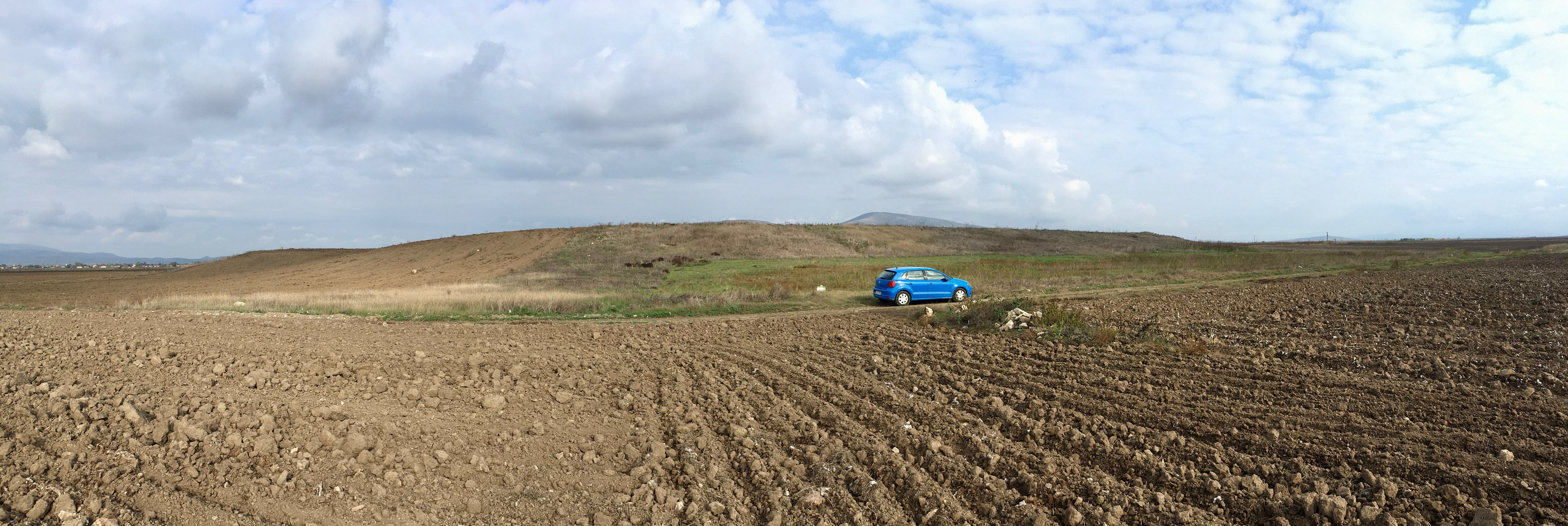
- The tell (magoula) of Paliambela, the site of ancient Phyllos

- Location within Greece
- 39°24′42″N 22°11′04″E
- Type: Ancient city
- Cultures: Ancient Greece
- Location: Fyllo, Palamas
- Region: Karditsa (regional unit), Greece

History
- Built: Mycenaean period
- Abandoned: Hellenistic period

Site notes
- Archaeologists: Jean-Claude Decourt

Phyllus or Phylos (Ancient Greek: Φύλλος) was a city near Mount Phylleium in the district of Thessaliotis, in ancient Thessaly. Strabo says the city was noted for a temple of Apollo Phylleius. Statius calls this city Phylli. The city is also cited by Stephanus of Byzantium.

The site of Phyllus is at Magoula Paliambela, a large tell in the modern municipal unit of Fyllo.
