= Alexander of Megalopolis =

2nd-century BC ancient Macedonian

Alexander of Megalopolis (Ancient Greek: Ἀλέξανδρος) was originally a Macedonian, but he received the franchise and was settled at Arcadian Megalopolis about 190 BC. He pretended to be a descendant of Alexander the Great, and accordingly, he called his two sons Philip and Alexander. His daughter Apama was married to Amynander king of Athamanians. Her eldest brother Philip, followed her to her court, and being of vain character, he allowed himself to be tempted with the prospect of gaining possession to the throne of Macedonia.
