= Damasouli =

Damasouli Δαμασούλι
- Settlement
- Location within Greece
- Coordinates: 39°42.8′N 22°10.2′E
- Country: Greece
- Administrative region: Thessaly
- Regional unit: Larissa
- Municipality: Tyrnavos
- Municipal unit: Tyrnavos
- Community: Damasi
- Elevation: 130 m (430 ft)

Population (2021)
  - Total: 51
- Time zone: UTC+2 (EET)
  - Summer (DST): UTC+3 (EEST)
- Postal code: 401 00
- Area code: +30-2492
- Vehicle registration: PI

Damasouli (Greek: Δαμασούλι, Greek pronunciation: [ðama'suli]) is a village in the municipality of Tyrnavos. Before the 1997 local government reform it was a part of the community of Damasi. The 2021 census recorded 51 inhabitants in the village.

== See also ==
- List of settlements in the Larissa regional unit
