= Pelinna =

Ancient Greek polis (city-state) of Ancient Thessaly

Coordinates: 39°34′33″N 21°55′35″E

Map showing ancient Thessaly. Pelinna (Pelinnaeum) is shown to the centre west north of Tricca.

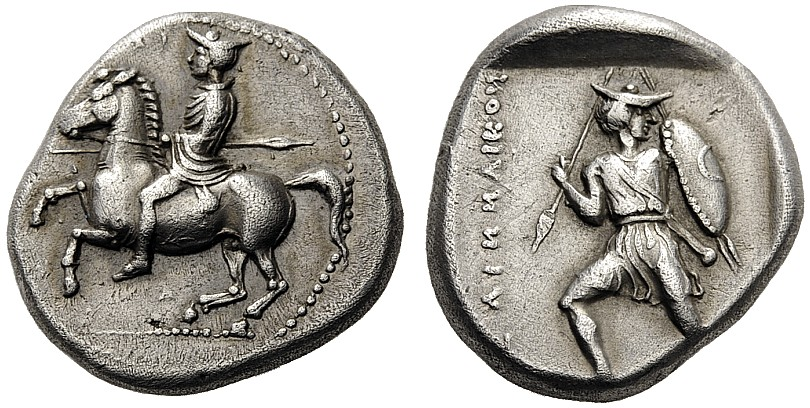

First side of the image: O: Horseman striking at fallen Hoplite with javelin
Second side of the image: R: Warrior holding shield ΠΕΛΙNNA_ION
silver coin from Pelinna struck 400-344 BC.

Pelinna (Greek: Πέλιννα) or Pelinnaeum (Greek: Πελινναῖον or Πεληναῖον) was an ancient Greek polis (city-state) of Ancient Thessaly, in the district Histiaeotis, a little above the left bank of the Peneius.

The city had a celebrated temple of Zeus Pelinnaeus. Pelinna was situated between Tricca and Pharcadon, near modern Palaiogardiki (Trikala regional unit). The city gained particular prominence in the fourth century BCE through its alliance with Philip II of Macedon. Among other archaeological evidence of the religious significance of Pelinna are two Orphic gold tablets (lamellae) found in 1985 on the site of Petroporos, dating to the late fourth century BCE.

It seems to have been a place of some importance even in the time of Pindar. Alexander the Great passed through the town in his rapid march from Illyria to Boeotia. It did not revolt from the Macedonians together with the other Thessalians after the death of Alexander the Great. In the war between Antiochus III the Great and the Romans, 191 BCE, Pelinna was occupied by the Athamanians, but was soon afterwards recovered by the Romans. The location of Pelinna is at Palaiogardíki (Petroporos), where there are considerable remains of the ancient town. William Martin Leake, describing the situation in the 19th century, stated that "the city occupied the face of a rocky height, together with a large quadrangular space at the foot of it on the south. The southern wall is more than half a mile in length, and the whole circumference near three miles." Joseph Hilarius Eckhel writes that the coins of this town bore the inscription Πεληναῖον. The nearby modern town of Pelinnaioi reflects the ancient name.
