= Pheca =

Fortress and town in ancient Thessaly

Coordinates: 39°31′25″N 21°37′47″E

Map showing ancient Thessaly. Phaeca is shown to the centre left near Gomphi.

Pheca or Phaika or Phaeca (Ancient Greek: Φαίκα) or Phecadum was a fortress and town lying between the pass of Portes and Gomphi in ancient Thessaly. In the war against Philip V of Macedon, Amynander of Athamania, king of the Athamanes, in co-operation with the Roman consul Titus Quinctius Flamininus, having descended from the pass of Portes, first took Pheca and then Gomphi itself, 198 BCE.

The site of Pheca is at modern Varybobi.
