= Androsthenes of Thessaly =

Thessalian military commander

Androsthenes (Ancient Greek: Ἀνδρόσθενης) of Thessaly was called the praetor of the country by Julius Caesar. (Note: by which he merely means the military commander, probably some kind of Thessalian strategos.) In 48 BCE, after Caesar's defeat at the hands of Pompey in the Battle of Dyrrhachium, Androsthenes shut the gates of Gomphi against Caesar.

When Caesar inevitability breached the walls, the aristocrats and magistrates, likely including Androsthenes committed suicide.
