= Phalanna =

Town and polis (city-state) of the Perrhaebi in ancient Thessaly

Coordinates: 39°43′17″N 22°10′06″E

Map showing ancient Thessaly. Phalanna is shown to the upper centre, north of Larissa.

Phalanna (Ancient Greek: Φάλαννα), was a town and polis (city-state) of the Perrhaebi in ancient Thessaly, situated on the left bank of the Peneius, southwest of Gonnus. Strabo says that the Homeric Orthe became the acropolis of Phalanna; but in the lists of Pliny Orthe and Phalanna occur as two distinct towns. Phalanna was said to have derived its name from a daughter of Tyro. It was written Phalannus in Ephorus, and was called Hippia by Hecataeus of Miletus. Phalanna is mentioned by Livy as near Mylae and Gyrton during the Third Macedonian War between the Romans and Perseus of Macedon in 171 BCE.

The site of Phalanna is in the modern community of Damasi (Δαμάσι) near the village of Damasouli (Δαμασούλι).
