= Phaestus (Thessaly) =

Map showing ancient Thessaly. Phaestus is shown in the centre north of Mt. Titanus.

Phaestus or Phaestos or Phaistos (Ancient Greek: Φαιστός) was a town of ancient Thessaly in the district Pelasgiotis, a little to the left of the Peneius. It was taken by the Roman praetor Marcus Baebius Tamphilus in 191 BCE.
