= Androsthenes of Corinth =

Androsthenes (Ancient Greek: Ἀνδρόσθενης) of Corinth defended Corinth against the Romans in 198 BCE, and was defeated in the following year by the Achaeans.
