= Charax (Thessaly) =

Charax (Ancient Greek: Χάραξ) was a fortress town of Perrhaebia in ancient Thessaly, on the left bank of the Peneus, at the entrance of the Vale of Tempe.
