= Myle (Lycia) =

Myle (Ancient Greek: Μύλη) was a town of ancient Lycia.

Its site is unlocated.
