= Pharcadon =

Coordinates: 39°34′00″N 22°00′44″E

Map showing ancient Thessaly. Pharcadon is shown to the centre left, west of Mt Titanus.

Pharcadon or Pharkadon (Ancient Greek: Φαρκαδών or Φαρκηδών) was a city and polis (city-state) of Histiaeotis in ancient Thessaly, situated to the left of the Peneius, between Pelinnaeum and Atrax.

In 200 BCE, during the Second Macedonian War, Athamanian troops commanded by Amynander of Athamania and troops of the Aetolian League, allies of the Romans, established their camps around the city of Pharcadon while they plundered the Thessalian plain. They were attacked by troops of Philip V of Macedon, who put them to flight.

The site of Pharcadon is on a hill near the village of Klokoto in the municipality of Farkadona, which was renamed to reflect its association with Pharcadon.
