= Charax (Lesser Armenia) =

Charax (Ancient Greek: Χάραξ) was an ancient fortress in Aetulane, Lesser Armenia.
