= Condylon =

Fortress in ancient Thessaly

Coordinates: 39°53′33″N 22°26′53″E

Condylon or Kondylon or Condylum (Ancient Greek: Κόνδυλον) or Kondylos was one of the four fortresses which defended the Vale of Tempe in ancient Thessaly. It was also called Gonno-Condylon, and was one of the towns of the Perrhaebi.

Condylon's site is at a place now called Zesti Vrysi.
