= Damasi, Larissa =

Damasi Δαμάσι
- Community
- Location within Greece
- Coordinates: 39°42.7′N 22°11.2′E
- Country: Greece
- Administrative region: Thessaly
- Regional unit: Larissa
- Municipality: Tyrnavos
- Municipal unit: Tyrnavos

Area
  - Community: 142.35 km^{2} (54.96 sq mi)
- Elevation: 111 m (364 ft)

Population (2021)
  - Community: 1,215
  - Density: 8.535/km^{2} (22.11/sq mi)
- Time zone: UTC+2 (EET)
  - Summer (DST): UTC+3 (EEST)
- Postal code: 401 00
- Area code: +30-2492
- Vehicle registration: PI

Damasi (Greek: Δαμάσι, Greek pronunciation: [ða'masi]) is a village and a community of the Tyrnavos municipality. Before the 2011 local government reform it was a part of the municipality of Tyrnavos. The community of Damasi covers an area of 143.35 km^{2}. In the territory of Damasi lies the site of the ancient city of Phalanna.

== Administrative division ==
The community of Damasi consists of two settlements:

- Damasi (population 1,164 in 2021)
- Damasouli (population 51)

== Population ==
Historical population
Year	Pop.	±%
2001	1,461	—
2011	1,444	−1.2%
2021	1,215	−15.9%

== See also ==
- List of settlements in the Larissa regional unit
