= Domeniko =

Domeniko Δομένικο
- Community
- Location within Greece
- Coordinates: 39°47.5′N 22°7.3′E
- Country: Greece
- Administrative region: Thessaly
- Regional unit: Larissa
- Municipality: Elassona
- Municipal unit: Potamia

Area
  - Community: 26.911 km^{2} (10.390 sq mi)
- Elevation: 280 m (920 ft)

Population (2021)
  - Community: 382
  - Density: 14.2/km^{2} (36.8/sq mi)
- Time zone: UTC+2 (EET)
  - Summer (DST): UTC+3 (EEST)
- Postal code: 402 00
- Area code: +30-2493
- Vehicle registration: PI

Domeniko (Greek: Δομένικο, Greek pronunciation: [ðo'meniko]) is a village and a community of the Elassona municipality. Before the 2011 local government reform it was a part of the municipality of Potamia, of which it was a municipal district. The community of Domeniko covers an area of 26.911 km^{2}.

== History ==
The ancient city of Cyretiae can still be traced on the hill where a church dedicated to Saint George now stands. It was a very important one and 2 representatives voted in the Delphic Amphictyony. In the Roman times the name of the city was changed to "Domeniko". Archaeological finds from the site are presented in the Diachronic Museum of Larissa.

Domeniko was mentioned in the 11th century by Anna Komnene. Domeniko was the seat of an Orthodox bishop during the Byzantine period. During the Axis occupation of Greece almost 150 residents of the village were executed by the Italian army.

== Economy ==
The population of Domeniko is occupied in animal husbandry and agriculture (mainly tobacco, grain and almonds).

== Population ==
Historical population
Year	Pop.	±%
2001	584	—
2011	627	+7.4%
2021	382	−39.1%

== See also ==
- List of settlements in the Larissa regional unit
