= Charax (Pontus) =

Charax (Ancient Greek: Χάραξ) was a town of ancient Pontus noted by Stephanus of Byzantium.

Its site is unlocated.
