= Cyropolis (Media Atropatene) =

Ancient City

Cyropolis (Ancient Greek: Κυρούπολις, Kyroúpolis) or Cyreschata (Old Persian: Kuruškaθa), both meaning "City of Cyrus", was a town in Media Atropatene, between the rivers Cyrus and Amardus. The town is reported by Ptolemy and Ammianus Marcellinus. Claudius Salmasius (in Solin. p. 840) has denied the separate existence of this town and contended that it is the same as the Cyropolis on the Jaxartes, asserting that the authority of Ammianus is of no weight as he generally follows Ptolemy. There seems to William Sandys Wright Vaux, a classicist of the 19th century, no great force in this argument, and if there were any district in which one might naturally expect to find a city called after Cyrus, it would surely be that with which he was immediately connected during his whole life.
