= Mount Titanus =

Mountain in Greece

Coordinates: 39°33′05″N 22°10′37″E

Mount Titanus or Mount Titanos (Greek: Τίτανος Όρος; Latin: Titanus Mons) is a mountain of ancient Thessaly, mentioned by Homer in the Iliad as near the ancient city of Asterium. Both Homer and Strabo note that the mountain's summits are white. The modern peak, Mount Titanos, preserves the ancient name.
