= Apamea =

Apamea or Apameia (Ancient Greek: Απάμεια) is the name of several Hellenistic cities in western Asia, after Apama, the Sogdian wife of Seleucus I Nicator, several of which are also former bishoprics and Catholic titular see.

Places called Apamea include:

== Asia Minor (Turkey) ==
- Apamea (Euphrates), in Osroene, opposite Zeugma on the Euphrates, now flooded by the Birecik Dam
- Apamea (Phrygia) or Apamea Cibotus, formerly Kibotos, commercial center of Phrygia, near Celaenae, now at Dinar, Afyonkarahisar Province; former bishopric and now a Latin Catholic titular bishopric
- Apamea Myrlea or Apamea in Bithynia, formerly Myrlea and Brylleion, in Bithynia, on the Sea of Marmara; currently near Mudanya, Bursa Province; former archdiocese, Latin Catholic titular archbishopric

== Iraq ==
- Apamea (Babylonia), on the Tigris near the Euphrates, precise location unknown
- Apamea (Sittacene), on the Tigris, precise location unknown

== Iran (Persia) ==
- Apamea (Media), in Media, near Laodicea (Nahavand, Iran), precise location unknown
- Apamea Ragiana, south of the Caspian Gates, in Parthia (later Media)

== Syria ==
- Apamea, Syria, on the Orontes River, northwest of Hama, Syria, a former Roman provincial capital and Metropolitan Archbishopric, now
  - Latin Catholic titular Metropolitan archbishopric
  - Melkite Catholic titular Metropolitan archbishopric
  - Syriac Catholic Catholic titular Metropolitan archbishopric
  - Greek Orthodox titular bishopric
  - Maronite Catholic titular bishopric

== See also ==
- Treaty of Apamea
- Apama (disambiguation)
