= Charax (Lydia) =

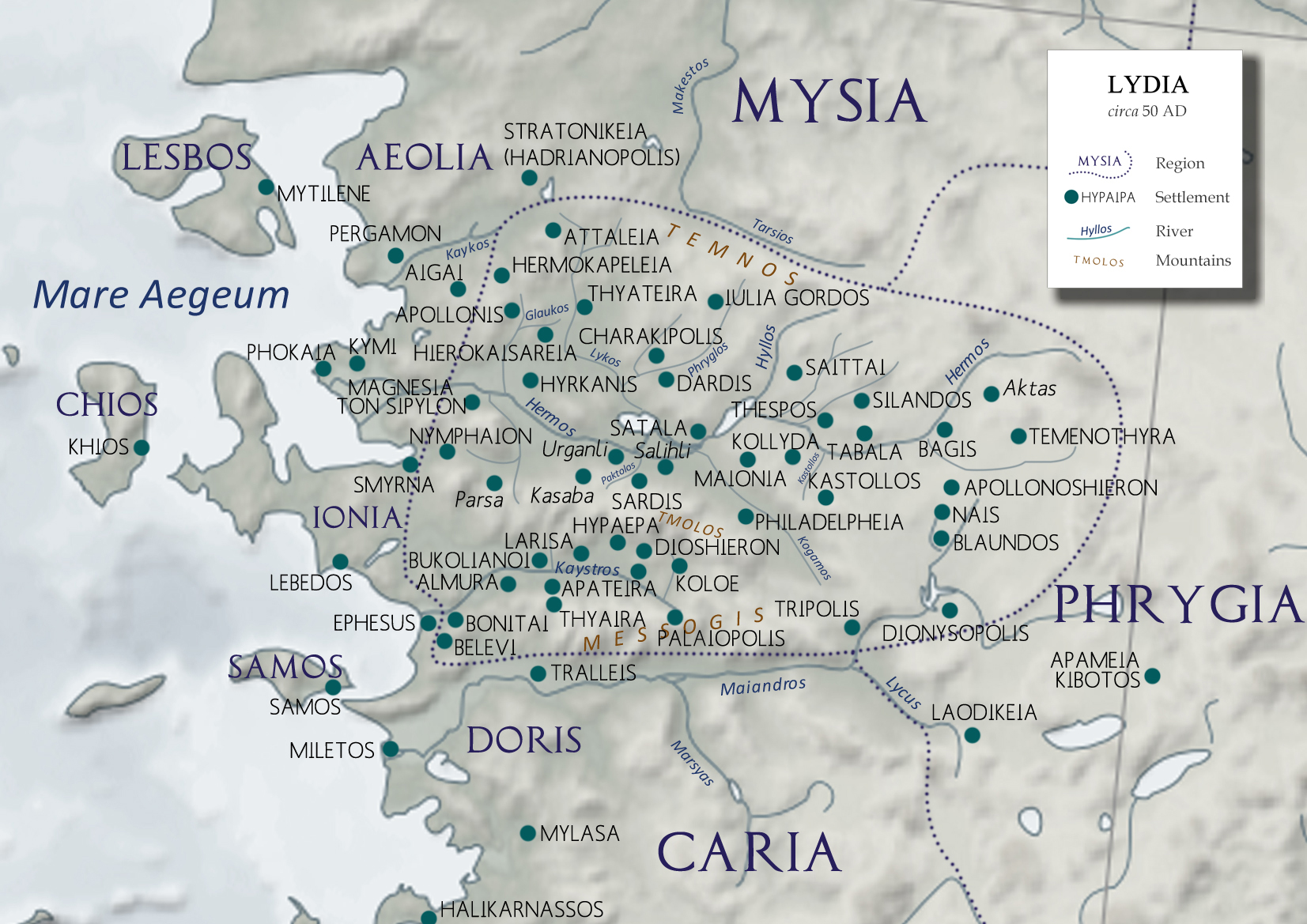
Map of Lydia around 50 CE, showing the town under the name Charakipolis.

Charax (Ancient Greek: Χάραξ), or Charakipolis, was a town of ancient Lydia, inhabited during Roman times.

Its site is located near Karayakup in Asiatic Turkey.
