= Charax Alexandri =

Charax Alexandri (Ancient Greek: Χάραξ Αλεξάνδρου) was a place in ancient Phrygia, near Celaenae, which was famed as a camp of Alexander the Great during his progress through Asia Minor, and afterward bore his name.
