= Fyllo =

Fyllo Φύλλο
- Municipal unit
- Location within the regional unit

- Location within Greece
- Coordinates: 39°27′N 22°11′E
- Country: Greece
- Administrative region: Thessaly
- Regional unit: Karditsa
- Municipality: Palamas

Area
  - Municipal unit: 139.2 km^{2} (53.7 sq mi)

Population (2021)
  - Municipal unit: 2,446
  - Municipal unit density: 17.57/km^{2} (45.51/sq mi)
  - Community: 564
- Time zone: UTC+2 (EET)
  - Summer (DST): UTC+3 (EEST)
- Vehicle registration: ΚΑ

Fyllo (Greek: Φύλλο) is a village and a former municipality in the Karditsa regional unit, Thessaly, Greece. Since the 2011 local government reform, it is part of the municipality Palamas, of which it is a municipal unit. The municipal unit has an area of 139.155 km^{2}. Population 2,446 (2021). The seat of the municipality was in Itea. Fyllo reflects the name of the ancient city of Phyllos, the site of which is located within the bounds of Fyllo's municipal unit.
