= Mylae (Cilicia) =

Town of ancient Cilicia

Coordinates: 36°18′18″N 33°51′07″E

Mylae or Mylai (Ancient Greek: Μυλαί), also called Mylas (Μύλας) or Myle, was a town of ancient Cilicia, located on a promontory of the same name, between Aphrodisias and Cape Sarpedon (modern Incekum Burnu).

Its site is located near Manastır in Asiatic Turkey.
