= Thessaliotis =

District of Thessaly

Thessaliotis (Ancient Greek: Θεσσαλιῶτις) was one of the four districts into which ancient Thessaly was divided. The others were Pelasgiotis, Histiaeotis, and Phthiotis. Thessaliotis corresponded to the central plain of Thessaly and the upper course of the river Peneius, so called because it was first occupied by the Thessalian conquerors from Epirus. Its major towns were: Pharsalus (the most important), Peirasia, Phyllus, Metropolis, Cierium, Euhydrium, and Thetidium.
