= Palamas =

Palamas Παλαμάς
- Municipality
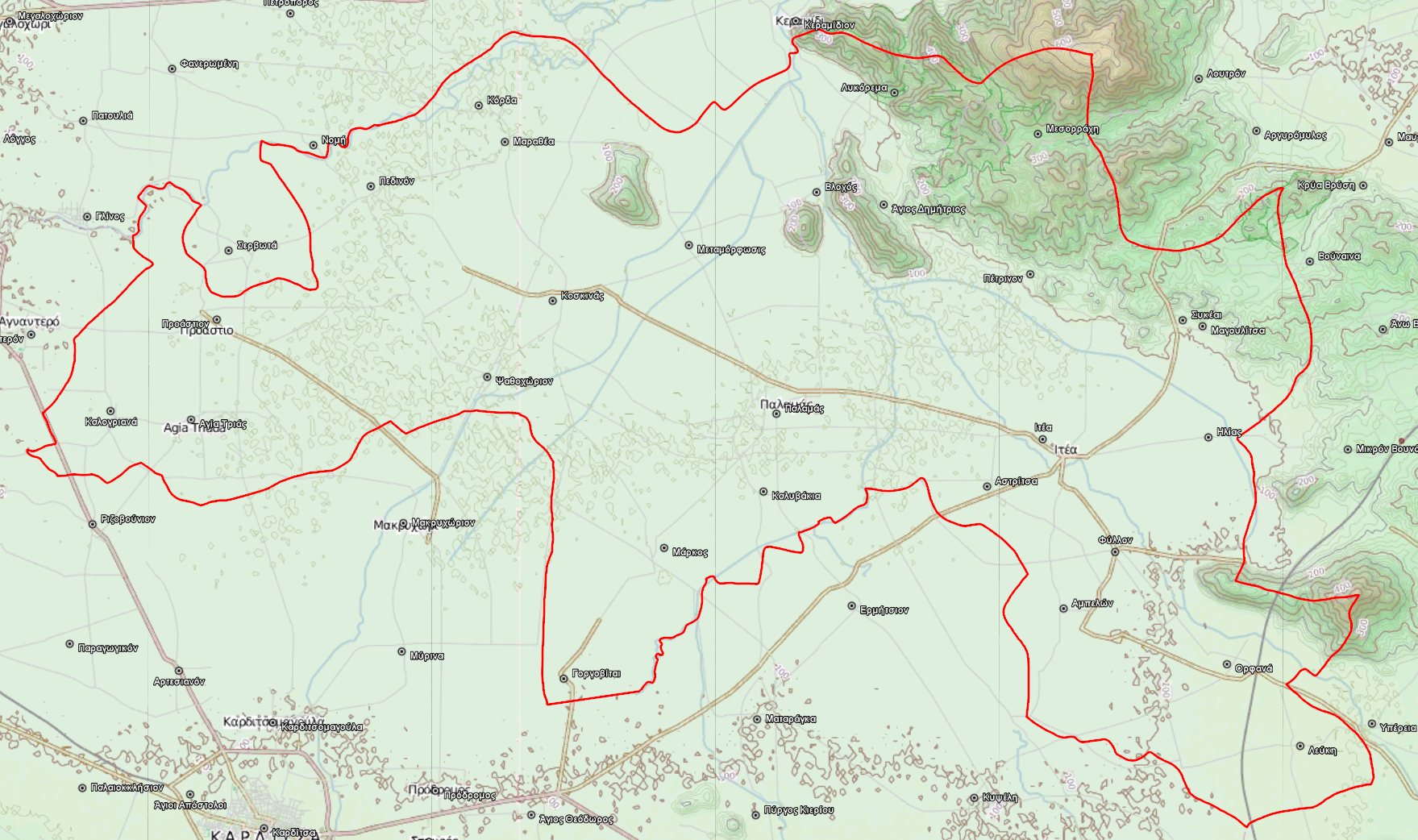

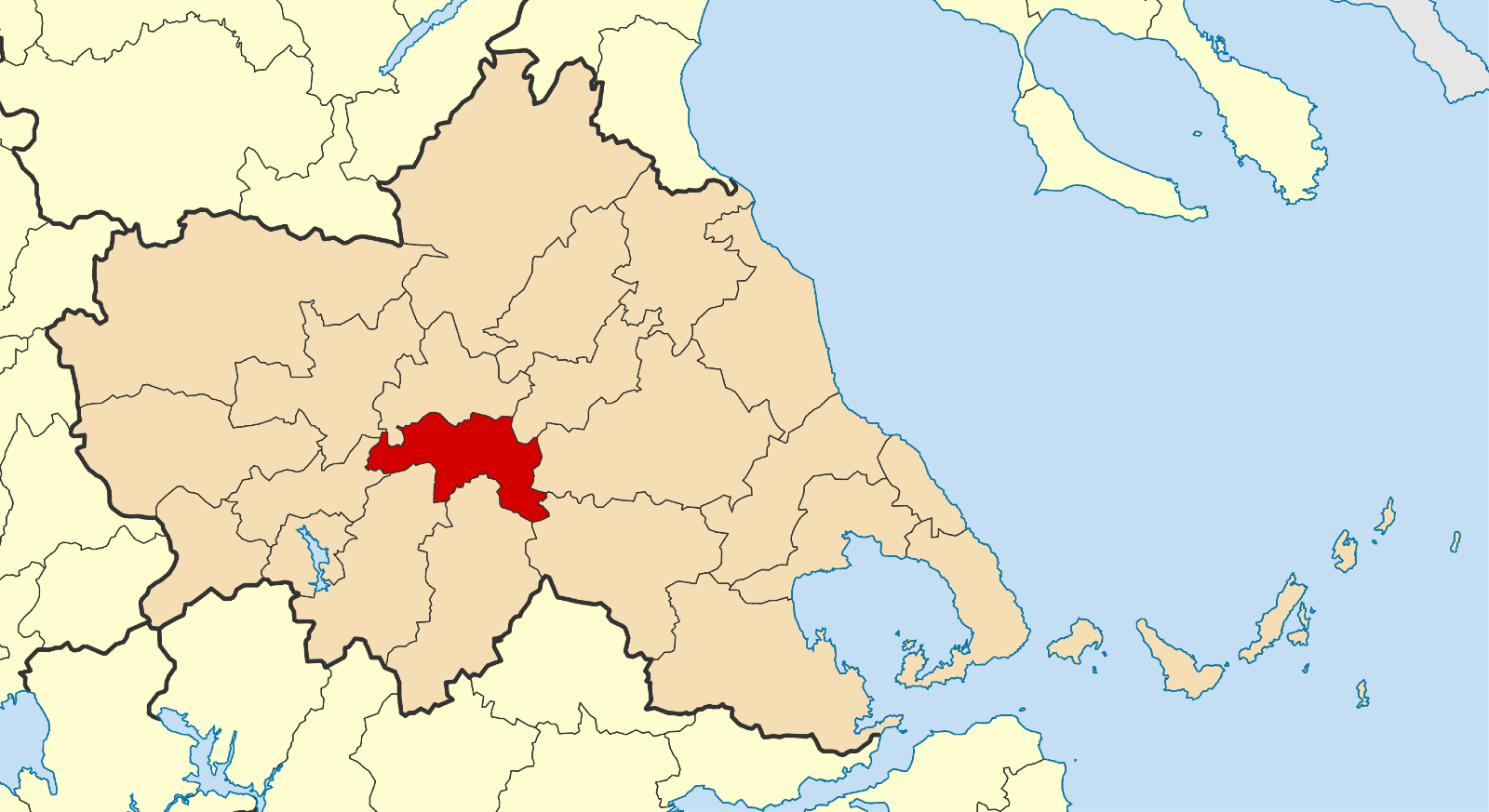

- Location within Greece
- Coordinates: 39°28′N 22°04′E
- Country: Greece
- Administrative region: Thessaly
- Regional unit: Karditsa

Area
  - Municipality: 382.7 km^{2} (147.8 sq mi)
  - Municipal unit: 154.1 km^{2} (59.5 sq mi)
- Elevation: 105 m (344 ft)

Population (2021)
  - Municipality: 13,424
  - Density: 35.08/km^{2} (90.85/sq mi)
  - Municipal unit: 7,324
  - Municipal unit density: 47.53/km^{2} (123.1/sq mi)
  - Community: 4,770
- Time zone: UTC+2 (EET)
  - Summer (DST): UTC+3 (EEST)
- Postal code: 432 00
- Area code: 26940
- Vehicle registration: KA

Palamas (Greek: Παλαμάς) is a town and a municipality in the Karditsa regional unit, Greece. Palamas is located south-southwest of Larissa, the capital of Thessaly, northwest of Lamia, north of Sofades, east-northeast of Karditsa and east-southeast of Trikala. The Pineios River is to the north as well as the Trikala regional unit.

== History ==
William Martin Leake wrote in Travels in Northern Greece (published in 1835), in the course of his description of the Thessalian plain, that Palama lay at a distance of two or three miles to the right of his route, near the Fersalitis, between Palama and Vlokho. He notes that in this stretch the Fersalitis is joined by a branch formed by the junction of the Vrysia, identified as the proper Apidanus, with a tributary issuing from the mountains of Agrafa below Smokovo and flowing by Sofadhes.

== Municipality ==
The municipality Palamas was formed at the 2011 local government reform by the merger of the following 3 former municipalities, that became municipal units:

- Fyllo
- Palamas
- Sellana

The municipality has an area of 382.722 km^{2}, the municipal unit 154.077 km^{2}.

=== Subdivisions ===
The municipal unit of Palamas is divided into the following communities:

- Agios Dimitrios
- Gorgovites
- Kalyvakia
- Koskina (Koskina, Psathochori)
- Markos
- Metamorfosi
- Palamas
- Vlochos (Vlochos, Lykorema)

== Population ==
Year	Town	Municipal unit	Municipality
1981	5,448	-	-
1991	6,010	-	-
2001	5,807	10,050	-
2011	5,745	8,903	16,726
2021	4,770	7,324	13,424

== Transportation ==
The Piraeus–Platy railway briefly passes through the municipality, near Orfana: the only railway station in the municipality is also called Orfana.

The A3 motorway and the Larissa–Karditsa road corridor (part of Karditsa Provincial Road 17 and Larissa Provincial Road 28) passes through the municipality: the EO30 road briefly passes through the municipality at the western end, near Kalogriana.

== Notable people ==
- Manthos Falagas (born 1992), football player
