= Eretria (Thessaly) =

Town of ancient Thessaly

Coordinates: 39°17′26″N 22°36′26″E

Map showing ancient Thessaly. Eretria is shown to the lower centre.

Eretria (Ancient Greek: Ἐρέτρια) was a town of ancient Thessaly, in the district Phthiotis, near Pharsalus. It was devastated by Philip V of Macedon during the Second Macedonian War in 198 BCE, and was where the Roman army under Titus Quinctius Flamininus camped at the end of the first day's march from Pherae towards Scotussa, in 197 BCE.

The location of Eretria is at a site just southwest of a place now called Eretria to reflect the ancient name, formerly Tsangli. William Martin Leake visited the site in the 19th century and found the ruined walls of an ancient city. "A long and narrow table-summit formed the citadel, of which the lower courses of the walls still exist in their whole circuit. The town walls are still better preserved, and are extant in some parts on the eastern side to the height of 18 or 20 feet [6 to 7 m]. Here also are two door-ways still perfect."
