= Doliche (Thessaly) =

Ancient Greek city and polis (city-state) in Perrhaebia in Thessaly

Coordinates: 40°03′27″N 22°10′00″E

Map showing ancient Thessaly. Doliche is shown to the centre top near Mount Olympus.

Doliche (Greek: Δολίχη) was an ancient Greek city and polis (city-state) in Perrhaebia in Thessaly, situated at the foot of Mount Olympus. Doliche, with the two neighbouring towns of Azorus and Pythion (Pythium), formed a Tripolis.

During the Roman–Seleucid War, the Tripolis was ravaged by an army of the Aetolian League in the year 191 BCE. During the Third Macedonian War the three towns surrendered to the army of Perseus of Macedon in the year 171 BCE, but that same year the Romans reconquered the three. In the year 169 BCE troops arrived from the Roman consul Quintus Marcius Philippus who camped between Azorus and Doliche.

The three cities minted a common coin with the inscription "ΤΡΙΠΟΛΙΤΑΝ".

The site is occupied by the modern town of Dolichi; when William Martin Leake visited the site in the 19th century, he found two fragments of Doric columns 2 feet 8 inches (81 cm) in diameter in a ruined church, and a sepulchral stone in the burying-ground, together with some squared blocks.
