= Lapathus (Thessaly) =

Map showing ancient Thessaly. Lapathus is shown to the upper centre.

Lapathus or Lapathos (Ancient Greek: Λάπαθος) was a fortress in the north of ancient Thessaly, near the Vale of Tempe.
