= Gomphi =

Town and polis (city-state) of Histiaeotis in ancient Thessaly

Coordinates: 39°26′46″N 21°40′22″E

Map showing ancient Thessaly. Gomphi is shown to the centre left.

Gomphi (Ancient Greek: Γόμφοι) was a town and polis (city-state) of Histiaeotis in ancient Thessaly, situated upon a tributary of the Peneius, and near the frontiers of Athamania and Dolopia. Its position made it a place of historical importance, since it guarded two of the chief passes into the Thessalian plains: "that of Musáki, distant two miles [three km], which was the exit from Dolopia, and the pass of Portes, at a distance of four miles [six km], which led into Athamania, and through that province to Ambracia."

In the war against Philip V of Macedon, Amynander of Athamania, king of the Athamanes, in co-operation with the Roman consul Titus Quinctius Flamininus, having descended from the latter pass, first took Pheca, a town lying between the pass and Gomphi, and then Gomphi itself, 198 BCE. The possession of this place was of great importance to Flamininus, since it secured him a communication with the Ambracian Gulf, from which he derived his supplies. The route from Gomphi to Ambracia is described by Livy as very short but extremely difficult. The capture of Gomphi was followed by the surrender of the towns named Argenta, Pherinium, Timarum, Ligynae, Strymon, and Lampsus, the position of which is quite uncertain. When Athamania revolted from Philip in 189 BCE, he marched into their country by the above-mentioned pass, but was obliged to retire with heavy loss. There can be no doubt that it was by the same route that the Roman consul Quintus Marcius Philippus marched from Ambracia into Thessaly in 169 BCE.

In the campaign between Julius Caesar and Pompey in 48 BCE, the inhabitants of Gomphi, having heard of Caesar's repulse at Dyrrhachium, shut their gates against him, when he arrived at the place from Aeginium; but he took the place by assault in a few hours. Caesar, in his account of these events, describes Gomphi as the "first town in Thessaly to those coming from Epirus." Coins minted at Gomphi survive.

The Byzantine author Hierocles notes that Gomphi was a bishopric in later times. No longer a resident bishopric, it remains a titular see of the Roman Catholic Church.

The site of the ancient town is near Mouzaki.
