= Pythion =

Coordinates: 40°03′28″N 22°13′09″E

Map showing ancient Thessaly. Pythion is shown to the centre top near Mount Olympus.

Pythion (Greek: Πύθιον) or Pythium, also Pythoion (Πύθοιον) was a city and polis (city-state) of Perrhaebia in ancient Thessaly, situated at the foot of Mount Olympus, and forming a Tripolis with the two neighbouring towns of Azorus and Doliche. Pythion derived its name from a temple of Apollo Pythius situated on one of the summits of Olympus, as we learn from an epigram of Xeinagoras, a Greek mathematician, who measured the height of Olympus from these parts. Games were also celebrated here in honour of Apollo.

== Geography ==
Pythion commanded an important pass across Mount Olympus. This pass and that of Tempe are the only two leading from Macedonia into the northeast of Thessaly.

== History ==
During the reign of Amyntas III or Philip II, the Tripolis was annexed to Macedon. According to Theagenes the inhabitants of Balla were relocated to Pythion. So we find in 3rd century BC an epigram regarding Philarchos son of Hellanion, Macedonian Elimiote from Pythion, proxenos in Delphi.

During the Roman–Seleucid War, the Tripolis was ravaged by an army of Aetolians in the year 191 BCE During the Third Macedonian War the three towns surrendered to the army of Perseus of Macedon in the year 171 BCE, but that same year the Romans reconquered the three. In the year 169 BCE troops arrived from the Roman consul Quintus Marcius Philippus who camped between Azorus and Doliche.

The three cities minted a common coin with the inscription "ΤΡΙΠΟΛΙΤΑΝ".

The site is at the modern town of Pythio. Modern excavations have uncovered the sanctuary of Apollo Pythius, including two temples of the Augustan period dedicated to Apollo Pythius and Poseidon Patroos. Finds from the temple of Apollo include two headless cult statues of the god and numerous inscriptions and sculptures from an earlier sanctuary.
