= Palaepharsalus =

Town of ancient Thessaly

Coordinates: 39°17′15″N 22°32′34″E

Palaepharsalus or Palaipharsalos (Ancient Greek: Παλαιοφάρσαλος - meaning "Old Pharsalus") was a town of ancient Thessaly, from which the town moved to the later location of Pharsalus.

The geographer Strabo writes of two towns, Palaepharsalus and Pharsalus, existing in historical times. His statement that the Thetideion, the temple to Thetis south of Scotussa, was "near both the Pharsaloi, the Old and the New," seems to imply that Palaeopharsalus was not itself close by Pharsalus. Although the battle of 48 BCE between Julius Caesar and Pompey is often called the Battle of Pharsalus by modern historians, four ancient writers – the author of the Bellum Alexandrinum, Frontinus, Eutropius, and Orosius – place it specifically at Palaepharsalus. In 198 BCE Philip V sacked Palaepharsalus but apparently spared Pharsalus itself.

== Location ==
John D. Morgan in his article “Palae-pharsalus – the Battle and the Town”, discusses the various locations which have been proposed for the location of Palaepharsalus. He rules out the hill of Fatih-Dzami within the walls of Pharsalus itself, proposed by Kromayer (1903, 1931) and Gwatkin (1956), since the attack by Philip V did not affect the new town. He also shows that it is unlikely to have been at Palaiokastro, 19 miles north-west of Pharsalus, proposed by Béquignon, since the site was abandoned c. 500 BC.

A possibility, proposed by Holmes (1908) and Lucas (1921), is the hill of Khtouri (Ktouri, Koutouri), some 7 miles north-west of Pharsalus on the south bank of the Enipeus. However, Morgan believes it is more likely to have been the hill just east of the village of Krini (formerly Driskoli) very close to the ancient highway from Larisa to Pharsalus. This site, which is some six miles (10 km) north of Pharsalus, and three miles north of the river Enipeus, not only has remains dating back to Neolithic times but also signs of habitation in the 1st century BC and later. The identification seems to be confirmed by the location of a place misspelled "Palfari" or "Falaphari" shown on a medieval route map of the Pharsalus-Larissa road just north of Pharsalus. This site also more closely matches the description of the battle of 48 BC (which is now held to have taken place north of the river Enipeus) as being close to Palaepharsalus.
