= Aeginium =

Ancient Greek settlement in the northwest of Thessaly

- Αἰγίνιον (Ancient Greek)
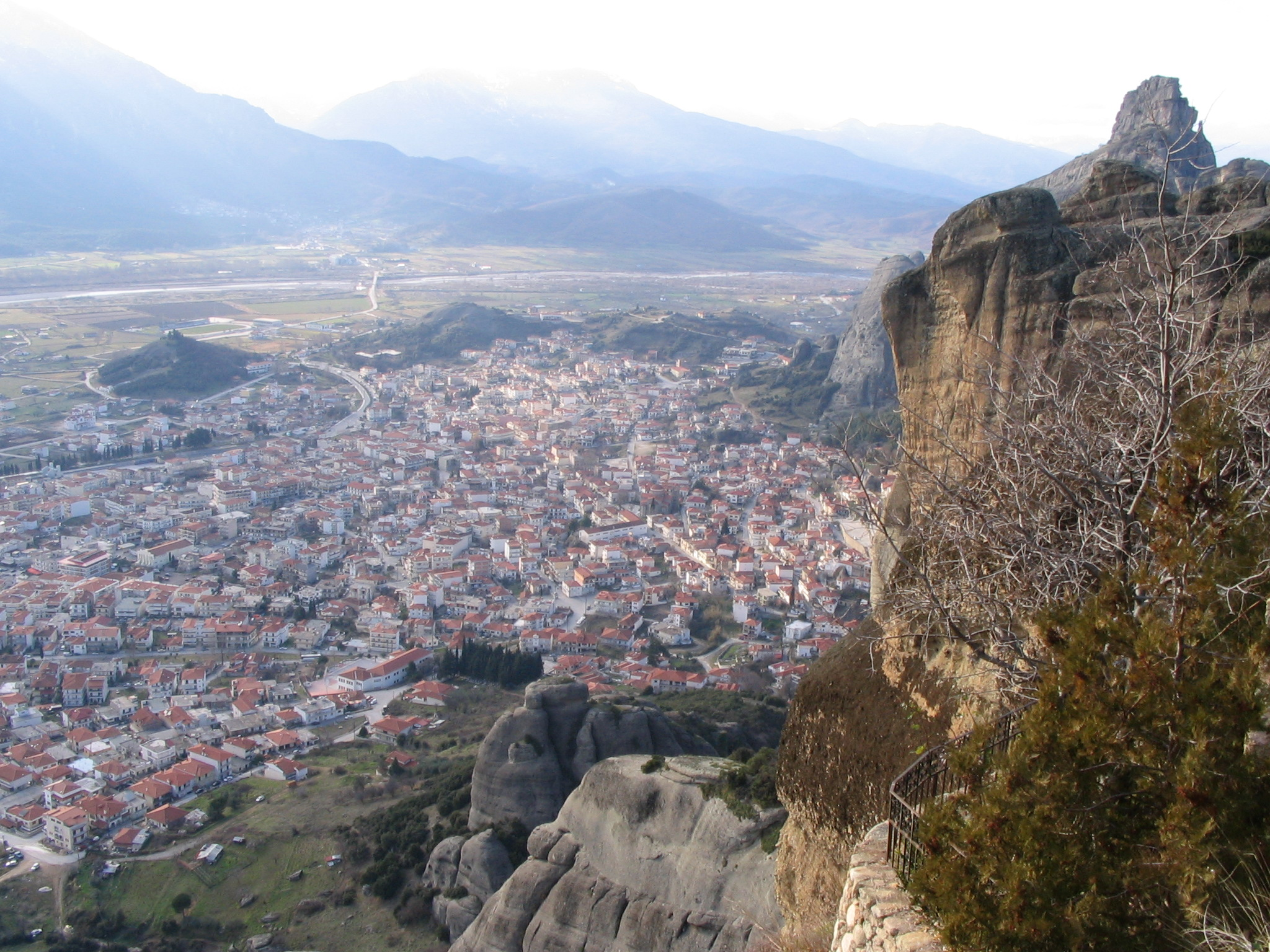
- View of Kalambaka, modern city on the spot of Aeginium. The bump in the upper right is the Rock of Great Saint. The Church of Saint John Prodrome is in the dense settlement below it. In the far distance is the Peneius River, flowing down from the right. Upstream is the pass from Epirus outflanking the Vale of Tempe as an entrance into Thessaly from Macedonia.

- 39°42′32″N 21°37′39″E
- Part of: Kalambaka

Site notes
- Condition: Fragmentary

Aeginium (Latin) or Aiginion (Ancient Greek: Αἰγίνιον) was an ancient Greek settlement in the northwest of Thessaly, attested by a number of ancient scholars, such as Strabo, Livy, Ptolemy, Pliny the Elder, and Stephanus of Byzantium.

== The discovery of Aeginium ==
=== The surveys of William Leake ===
The site was surveyed by British Army officer William Martin Leake, when he was stationed in Greece between 1804 and 1810 during the Napoleonic Wars. In 1835, he published a multi-volume work describing northern Greece which reported his discoveries. Based on an inscription he found at Kalabaka which mentioned Aeginium, the location of the city has been tentatively assigned to a site in Nea Koutsoufliani.

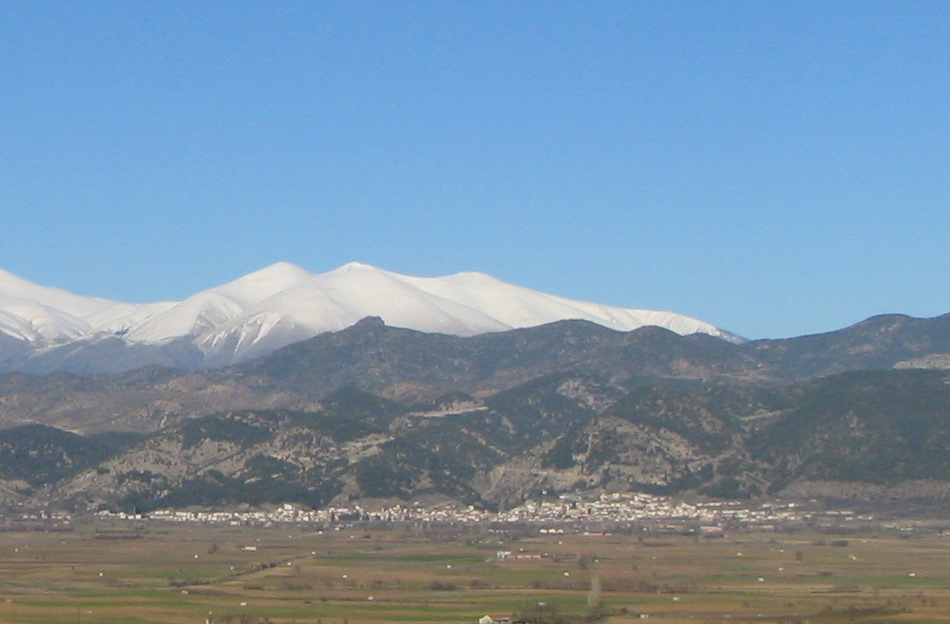
The mountain barrier between Thessaly and Macedonia seen from Thessaly north of Larissa. Mount Olympus is in the background.

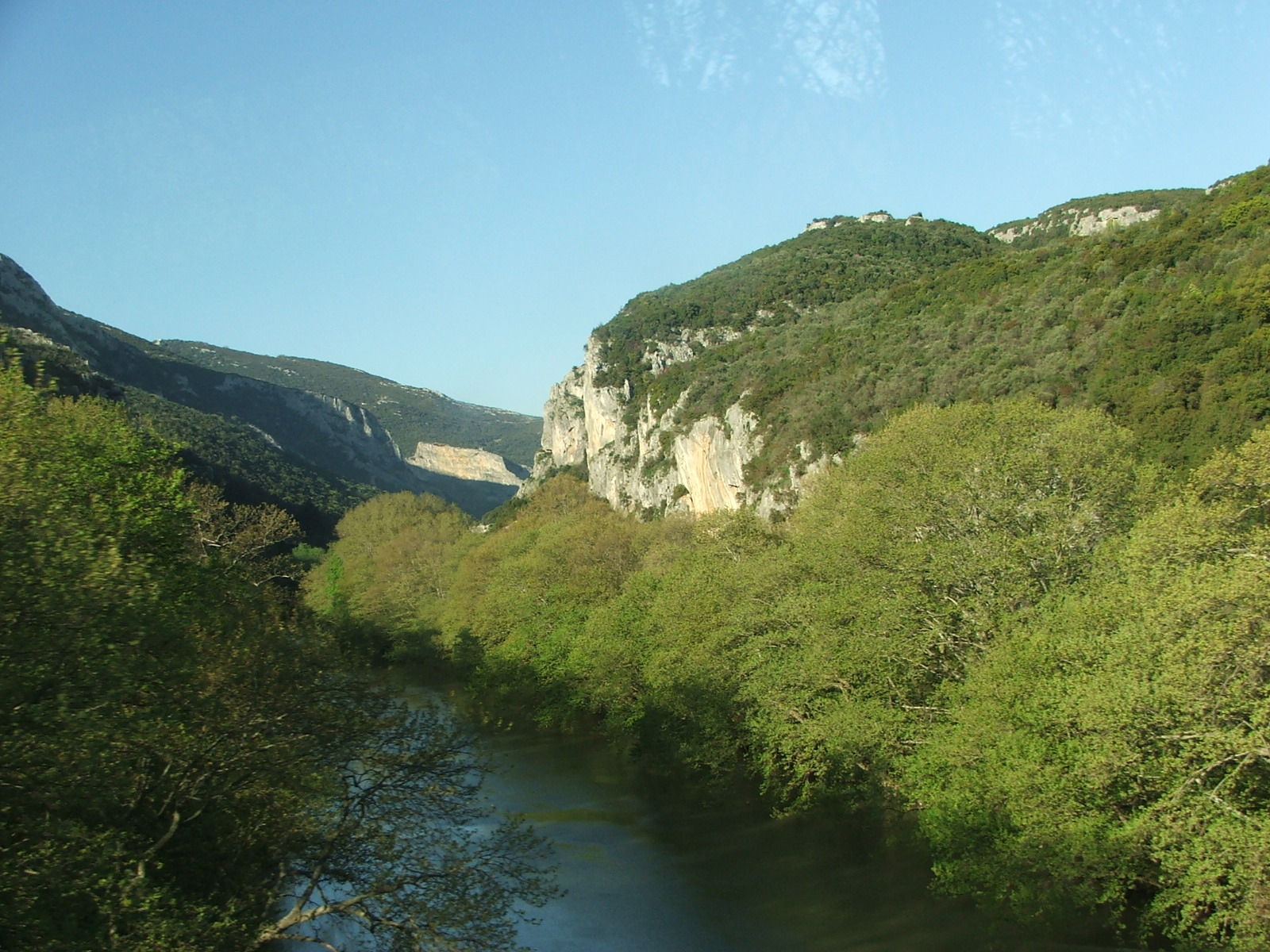
Vale of Tempe

=== Byzantine city of Stagoi ===
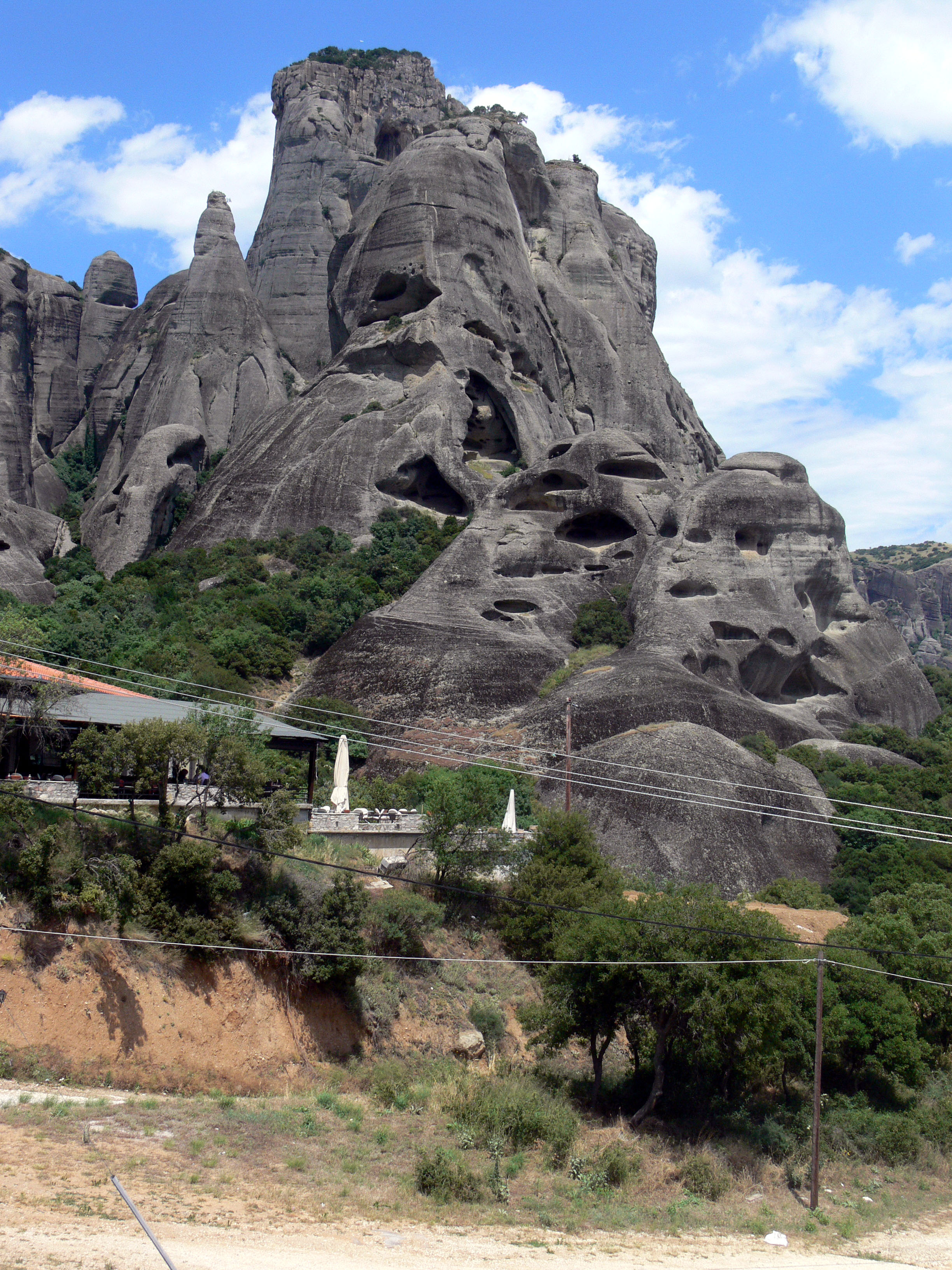
Meteora, showing some of the caves inhabited by the first monks.

The plains of Upper Thessaly were not available to invaders via the upper Peneius for free, so to speak. They were also heavily defended. On the left bank of the Peneios at the entrance to the plain is a raised massif of vertical, chimney like formations called Meteora. At the base of Meteora is the city of Kalabaka, which bears a Turkish name. Over the centuries the tops and sides of these natural towers have been the sites of monastery enclosures.

A common anti-Turkish sentiment is that the first of these aerial monastics were escaping the Turks. This view does not conform to the dates and types of historical events. Constantinople was occupied by its first Turkish conqueror, the 21-year-old Mehmed II, in 1453. Considered the Alexander of his day, he declared himself Roman Emperor. Invited to dinner, the prelate intimated that he was probably expected to perform the difficult task of stepping down. The new emperor, who seemed to have a way with words, replied that he was being asked to do something harder, to stay. The emperor was then recognized by the Eastern Orthodox Church. The Catholics, however, began treating accession of Mehmed as the final end of the Roman Empire. The Turks on the whole preferred to leave Christianity in place, including the churches and monasteries. Greece was just as Christian at the end of Ottoman rule as it had been at the beginning.

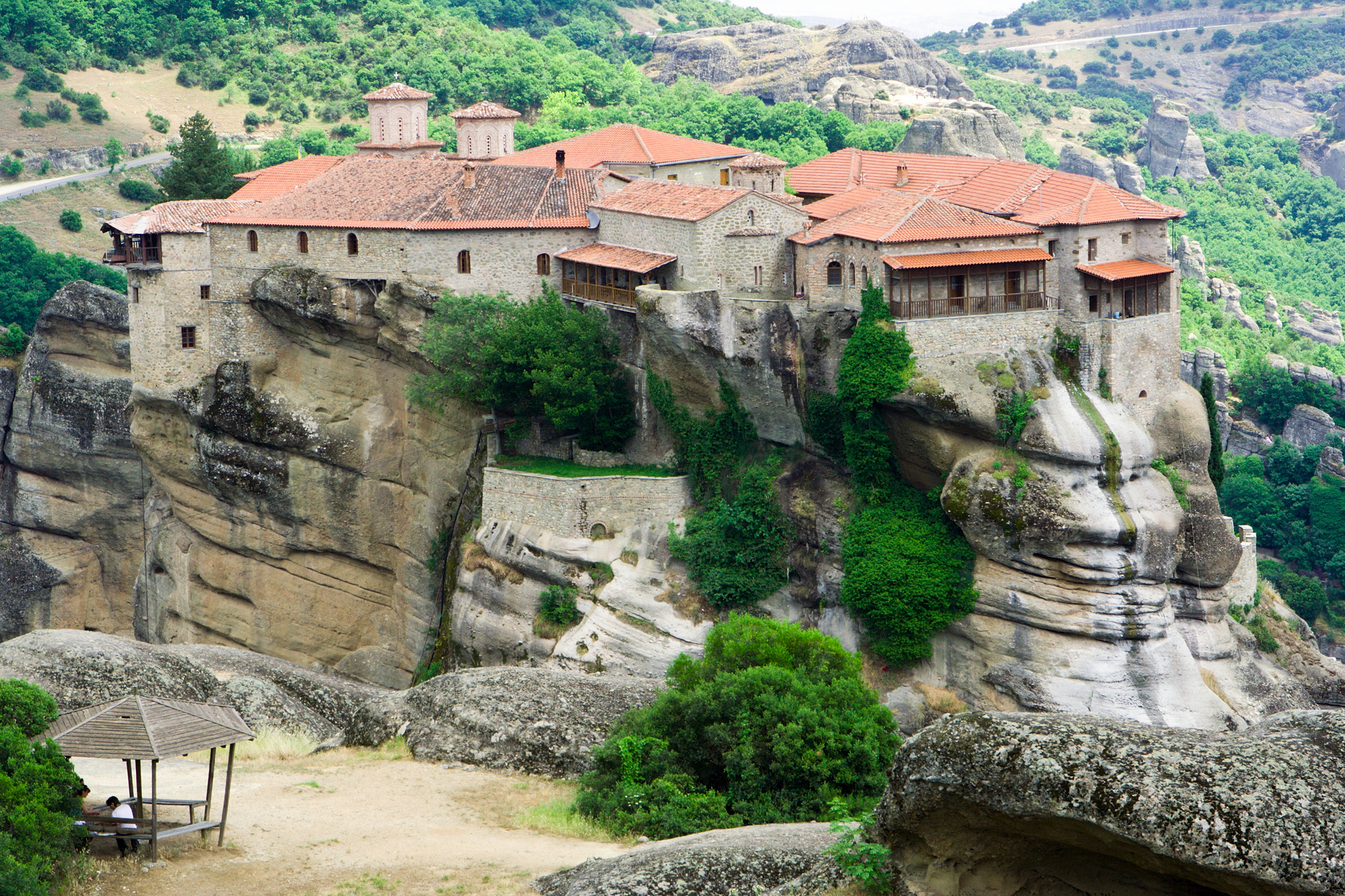
Monastery of Great Meteoron

The Byzantine church had its own name for the city: στάγοι, a plural. There were no Turkish assaults on the place, and no refugees seeking the protection of the rocks, unless from the world in general. Monks had been seeking shelter in caves there since before the 12th century. In the 12th the churches of Stagoi began to build monasteries in the heights, starting with the Church of Panagia Doupiane, which built the monastery of Panagia Doupiane in the heights above the city. The practice found favor among the churchmen of Thessaly and expanded from there. In 1340 Athanasius the Meteorite founded and named Monastery of Great Meteoron, innovating the second word, to mean "the great up-in-the-air," with a spiritual significance as well as a physical.

It is frequently mentioned in the Roman wars in Greece. It was given up to plunder by L. Aemilius Paulus in 167 BCE for having refused to open its gates after the Battle of Pydna. It was here that, during the civil war between Pompey and Julius Caesar, that the latter in his march from Apollonia effected a junction with Gnaeus Domitius Calvinus. Later, the town was called by the name Stagos which was translated to Kalabaka.

== Bibliography ==
- Kalyvas, Grigoris G. (17 November 2019). "Η ΚΑΛΑΜΠΑΚΑ και η Επισκοπή των ΣΤΑΓΩΝ μέσα από την Ιστορία, τα γεγονότα, τα πρόσωπα "KALABAKA and the Diocese of STAGA through History, events, persons". ΣΤΑΓΩΝ (Stagon) News (in Greek).
