= Amynander of Athamania =

2nd-century BC ruler in Epirus

Amynander (Ancient Greek: Ἀμύνανδρος, Amynandros, in Polybios also Amynas) was king of the Athamanes in south Epirus, following his predecessor Theodorus of Athamania. He was a brother-in-law of the Illyrian king Scerdilaidas and first appears in history as a mediator between Philip V of Macedon and the Aetolians.

When the Romans were about to wage war on Philip, they sent ambassadors to Amynander to inform him of their intention. On the commencement of the war, he came to the camp of the Romans and promised them assistance: the task of bringing over the Aetolians to an alliance with the Romans was assigned to him.

In 198 BC Amynander took the towns of Phoca and Gomphi, and ravaged Thessaly. He was present at the conference between Flamininus and Philip, and during the short truce was sent by the former to Rome. He was again present at the conference held with Philip after the battle of Cynoscephalae. On the conclusion of peace, he was allowed to retain all the fortresses which he had taken from Philip.

In the war which the Romans, supported by Philip, waged with Antiochus III, Amynander was induced by his brother-in-law, Philip of Megalopolis, to side with Antiochus, to whom he rendered active service. But in 191 BC he was driven from his kingdom by Philip and fled with his wife and children to Ambracia. The Romans required that he should be delivered up, but their demand was not complied with, and with the assistance of the Aetolians he recovered his kingdom. He sent ambassadors to Rome and to the Scipiones (generals Scipio Africanus and Lucius Cornelius Scipio, who would earn the agnomen "Asiaticus" from this war) in Asia, to treat for peace, which was granted him. (b. c. 189.) He afterwards induced the Ambraciots to surrender to the Romans.

Amynander married Apama, the daughter of Alexander of Megalopolis. Regarding his death we have no accounts.
