= Azorus =

Town and polis (city-state) in Perrhaebia in ancient Thessaly

Coordinates: 39°59′09″N 22°04′57″E

Map showing ancient Thessaly. Azorus is shown to the top centre in the Perrhaebian Tripolis.

Azorus or Azoros (Ancient Greek: Ἄζωρος or Ἀζώριον) was a town and polis (city-state) in Perrhaebia in ancient Thessaly situated at the foot of Mount Olympus. Azorus, with the two neighbouring towns of Pythium and Doliche, formed a Tripolis.

During the Roman–Seleucid War, the Tripolis was ravaged by an army of the Aetolian League in the year 191 BCE. During the Third Macedonian War the three towns surrendered to the army of Perseus of Macedon in the year 171 BCE, but that same year the Romans reconquered the three. In the year 169 BCE troops arrived from the Roman consul Quintus Marcius Philippus who camped between Azorus and Doliche.

The three cities minted a common coin with the inscription "ΤΡΙΠΟΛΙΤΑΝ".

The site of Azorus is the palaiokastro (old fort) at the modern village of Azoros. According to the 5th-century grammarian Hesychius of Alexandria the town was named after the mythological Azorus, helmsman of the Argo.
