= Battle of the Aous (198 BC) =

Battle of the Second Macedonian War

Coordinates: 40°38′34″N 19°19′2″E

Location	between modern Tepelenë and Këlcyrë
Result	Roman Empire victory Roman Empire Conquest Aous

Belligerents
Roman Republic	Kingdom of Macedon

Commanders and leaders
Titus Quinctius Flamininus	Phillip V

The Battle of the Aous was fought in 198 BC between the Roman Republic and the Kingdom of Macedon, in the area between modern Tepelenë and Këlcyrë in Albania. The Roman forces were led by Titus Quinctius Flamininus and the Macedonian ones were led by Philip V.

The Antigonid Macedonian army encamped behind a pass in an unassailable position. A local shepherd guided the Romans to a secret path that took them behind the Macedonian position. Flaminius led his troops through this secret path and attacked the Macedonians from the rear, rendering their position untenable and inflicting some 2,000 casualties. Philip's army retreated with the survivors, and the two commanders would meet again at Cynoscephalae the following year, where the Romans would triumph again and end the war.
