= Perrhaebia =

District of ancient Thessaly

Perrhaebia (Greek: Περραιβία) was the northernmost district of ancient Thessaly, where the tribe of the Perrhaebi lived. Major cities were: Pythion, Doliche, Azorus, Oloosson and Phalanna the capital. Perrhaebia was part of Macedonia between the 4th and 1st centuries BC.
