= William Martin Leake =

British Army officer, spy, topographer, antiquarian (1777–1860)

William Martin Leake FRS
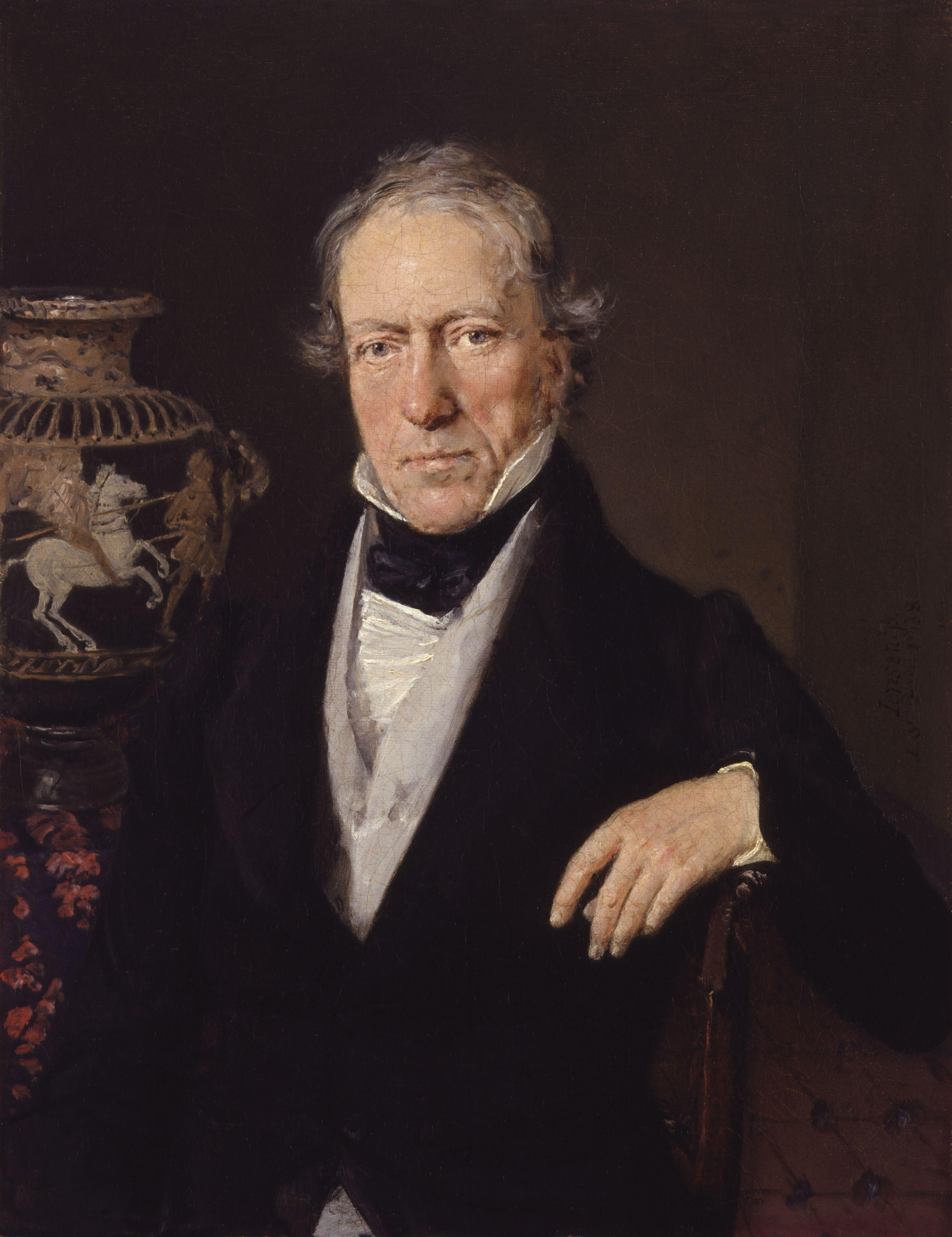
- Portrait by Christian Albrecht Jensen, 1838
- Born: 14 January 1777; Mayfair, London
- Died: 6 January 1860 (aged 82); Brighton, England
- Military career
- Allegiance: Great Britain; United Kingdom
- Branch: British Army
- Service years: 1794–1815
- Rank: Colonel
- Units: Royal Artillery
- Conflicts: French Revolutionary Wars; Napoleonic Wars

Colonel William Martin Leake, FRS (14 January 1777 – 6 January 1860) was a British Army officer, spy, topographer, diplomat, antiquarian and writer who served in the French Revolutionary and Napoleonic Wars. He spent much of his career in the British army in the Mediterranean seaports. Leake developed an interest in geography and culture of the regions visited, and authored a number of works, mainly about Greece.

== Life ==
Leake was born in London to John Martin Leake and Mary Calvert Leake. Following a family tradition, he was commissioned into the British Army's Royal Artillery as an officer; he completed his training at the Royal Military Academy, Woolwich in 1794 and was commissioned as a second lieutenant. Having spent four years in the West Indies as lieutenant of marine artillery, he was promoted to captain, and was sent in 1799 by the government to Constantinople to train the forces of the Ottoman Empire in the use of artillery. The British Empire had decided to support the Ottoman in its defence against Napoleonic France. A journey through Asia Minor in 1800 to join the British fleet at Cyprus inspired him with an interest in antiquarian topography. In 1801, after travelling across the desert with the Ottoman army to Egypt, he was, on the expulsion of the French, employed in surveying the Nile valley as far as the cataracts; but having sailed with the ship engaged to convey the Elgin Marbles from Athens to England, he lost all his maps and observations when the vessel foundered off Cerigo in Greece.

For much of the first decade of the nineteenth century, Leake was employed by the Foreign Office to spy in Greece in the guise of a wandering tourist, with the intent of gathering topographical information which would be useful in the case of a French invasion. Shortly after his arrival in England, he was sent out to survey the coast of Albania and the Morea, with the view of assisting the Turks against attacks of the French from Italy, and of this he took advantage to form a valuable collection of coins and inscriptions and to explore ancient sites. In 1807, war having broken out between the Ottoman Empire and Britain, he was made prisoner at Salonica; but, obtaining his release the same year, he was sent on a diplomatic mission to Ali Pasha of Ioannina, whose confidence he completely won, and with whom he remained for more than a year as British representative. He was there in 1809 when Lord Byron visited Ali's court.

In 1810 he was granted a yearly sum of £600 for his services in Turkey. In 1815 he retired from the army, in which he held the rank of colonel, devoting the remainder of his life to topographical and antiquarian studies. He joined the learned Society of Dilettanti and became vice-president of the Royal Society of Literature. He was admitted a Fellow of the Royal Society on 13 April 1815.

He died in Steyning, Sussex on 6 January 1860. The marbles collected by him in Greece were presented to the British Museum; his bronzes, vases, gems and coins were purchased by the University of Cambridge after his death, and are now in the Fitzwilliam Museum. He was also elected as a Fellow of the Royal Geographical Society, received the honorary DCL at Oxford in 1816, and was a member of the Berlin Academy of Sciences and correspondent of the Institute of France.

== Works ==
He authored:

- Researches in Greece (1814)
- The topography of Athens: With some remarks on its antiquities (1821)
- Journal of a tour in Asia Minor: with comparative remarks on the ancient and modern geography of that country (1824)
- Travels in the Morea: With a map and plans (1830), and a supplement, Peloponnesiaca (1846)
- Travels in Northern Greece (1835)
- Numismata Hellenica (1854), followed by a supplement in 1859

His Topography of Athens, the first attempt at a systematic treatment, long remained an authority.

== Sources ==
- This article incorporates text from a publication now in the public domain: Chisholm, Hugh, ed. (1911). "Leake, William Martin". Encyclopædia Britannica. Vol. 16 (11th ed.). Cambridge University Press. p. 329.
- Goekoop, Cees H. (2010). Where on Earth is Ithaca? A Quest for the Homeland of Odysseus. Utrecht: Eburon. ISBN 978-90-5972-344-3.
- Marsden, John Howard (1864). A brief memoir of the life and writings of the late Lieutenant-Colonel William Martin Leake. London: Printed by Whittingham and Wilkins for private circulation only.
- McNeal, R. A. (1993). ""Introduction"". In McNeal, R. A. (ed.). Nicholas Biddle in Greece: The Journals and Letters of 1806. State College: Pennsylvania State University Press. pp. 1–48. ISBN 978-0-271-03445-4.
- Whitley, James (2001). The Archaeology of Ancient Greece. Cambridge: Cambridge University Press. ISBN 978-0-521-62733-7.
