= Gonni =

Gonni may refer to:

- Gonnoi, a town in modern Greece
- Gonnus, a town of ancient Thessaly, Greece
