= Elpeus =

River in Greece

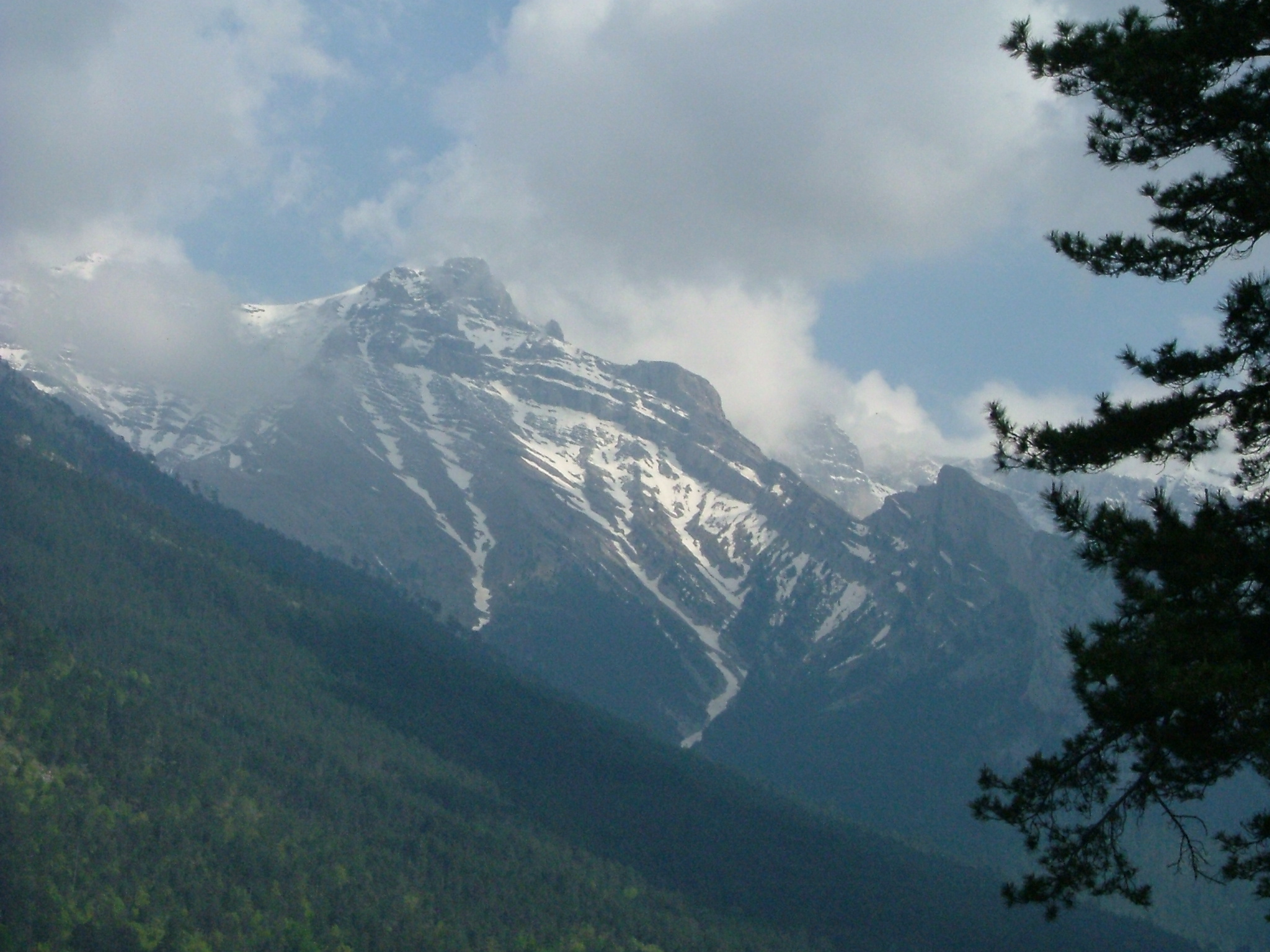
The Elpeus river is situated on the slopes of Mount Olympus, seen here.

The Elpeus is a river that stems from a ravine on the lower banks of Mount Olympus in Greece, located approximately five miles from the city of Dion.

== Name ==
Although the river Elpeus is commonly referred to as Enipeus (Ενιπέας) in modern Greek, this name does not appear to have been used in antiquity for the river in Pieria. Ancient sources such as Strabo, Plutarch, and Pausanias do not mention an Enipeus in this region, nor do classical lexicons like that of Hesychius (5th century CE), which only refers to the Enipeus of Thessaly.

The river near Dion is more plausibly identified with the Elpeus (or Elpios), a name found in ancient literary sources such as Livy (Book 44, 7–8) and possibly Cassius Dio. The modern designation "Enipeus" may have emerged through a confusion with the better-known Enipeus, a tributary of the Alpheus in the Peloponnese, near ancient Heraclea. This Peloponnesian Enipeus was associated with a region called Pisatis (in today’s Olympia valley), which, like Pieria, featured two prominent hills named Ossa and Olympus and was linked to the worship of Dionysus. Such geographic and mythological parallels may have led to the transfer or misattribution of the name.

The first documented use of the name Enipeus for the river near Litochoro appears in an 18th-century map by C. Cellarius (1774), suggesting that the misnaming likely originated during the early modern period of European cartography. Despite the name’s widespread use today, Elpeus is likely the historically accurate designation.

== Geography ==
The river stream runs on a steep bank. In the summer months, the river all but dries up to a thin trickle, but, during the winter season, it regularly overflows. This results in the formation of strong whirlpools above its crags, while flowing down the eroded slopes of the mountain to the sea. These overflowings produce deep and wide chasms, with sheer slopes on either side. This makes the river very dangerous to cross and it is almost impassable during these months.

== History ==
The danger that the overflowing Elpeus river presents has been used tactically in warfare situations throughout history. During the Third Macedonian War, which started in 171 BC, Perseus of Macedon camped on a safe bank of the river, his intent being to use the flooded river as part of his defences. This particular position proved unassailable to his Roman enemies, who were, at the time, under the command of Lucius Aemilius Paulus Macedonicus. Paulus and his council spent much time deciding how to negotiate the river and breach Perseus' defences, some suggesting a counter-attack from behind Perseus camp and the river, while others recommended that a fleet be sent up the coast towards Thessalonica to draw the Macedonians out. Paulus ultimately decided to feint right and fool Perseus as to his intentions, while sending a force to the left and behind the river. The war ultimately resulted in Roman victory, in 168 BC, concluding at the Battle of Pydna.
