= Argura =

Argura Argissa, Argusa
- Ancient Greek: Ἄργουρα; Ἄργισσα, Ἆργουσσα
- Location within Greece
- 39°39′35″N 22°20′28″E
- Type: Settlement
- Periods: Archaic Greece – Roman Greece
- Location: Gremnos Magoula, near Larissa
- Region: Pelasgiotis

Argura (Ancient Greek: Ἄργουρα), called Argissa (Ἄργισσα) in Homer's Iliad, was a town and polis (city-state) in Pelasgiotis in ancient Thessaly, on the Peneus, and near Larissa. The name of the town was also given as Argusa (Ἆργουσσα) in some ancient sources. The distance between this place and Larissa is so small as to explain the remark of the Scholiast on Apollonius of Rhodes, that the Argissa of Homer was the same as Larissa. The editors of the Barrington Atlas of the Greek and Roman World and The Princeton Encyclopedia of Classical Sites identify the site of Agura with a place called Gremnos Magoula, approximately 7 kilometres (4.3 mi) west of Larissa, which has a nearby tumulus.

== Archaeology ==
Excavations of the site have yielded a walled enclosure of the 5th and 4th centuries BCE opus isodomum style, with square towers. The agora has been located and the temples have been identified. The ceramic material found covers from the seventh century BCE to the third century CE. Dedications found attest to the cult of Apollo Pythius and of Artemis.
