= Spyridon Kourevelis =

Greek army general (fl. 1882–1922)

Spyridon Kourevelis (Greek: Σπυρίδων Κουρέβελης; fl. 1882–1922) was a Greek army general.

== Life ==
Spyridon Kourevelis was born at Galaxidi in 1861. After beginning his military service in 1882, he remained in the army. In 1885, he served in the 7th Infantry Battalion and participated in the clashes with the Ottoman Empire at Nezeros. He entered the NCO school, and graduated in 1891 as an infantry second lieutenant.

During the Greco-Turkish War of 1897, he served in the 8th Infantry Regiment, participating in the Battle of Velestino, where he was severely wounded. In 1904 he was one of the first officers to join the Macedonian Struggle, remaining in Ottoman-ruled Macedonia for two years.

During the First Balkan War he commanded an Evzone company in the Konstantinopoulos Detachment. By the time of the Second Balkan War, he had been promoted to major and commander of the 6th Evzone Battalion. He distinguished himself in the battles of Gevgelija and Lake Doiran; his unit suffered over 60% casualties during the latter battle, and Kourevelis himself was wounded.

After the war, he was appointed principal aide de camp of King Constantine I, being promoted to colonel in 1916. During the National Schism he sided with the royalists and was amongst the most fanatical anti-Venizelists during the Noemvriana riots. As a result, when Eleftherios Venizelos assumed the government of Greece in June 1917, Kourevelis was imprisoned.

He was released after the royalist victory in the November 1920 elections, and recalled to active service. He was appointed commander of the 12th Infantry Division at Saranta Ekklisiai, and then of the 8th Infantry Division at Ioannina. Promoted to major general, he finally assumed command of the Adrianople Division until the Greek defeat in the Asia Minor Campaign, after which he was dismissed from the army, receiving the rank of lieutenant general.

== Sources ==
- Moschovitis, P. (1929). Μεγάλη Στρατιωτικὴ καὶ Ναυτικὴ Ἐγκυκλοπαιδεία. Tόμος Τέταρτος: Καβάδης–Μωριάς [Great Military and Naval Encyclopaedia. Volume IV: Kavadh–Morea] (in Greek). Athens: Ἔκδοσις Μεγάλης Στρατιωτικῆς καὶ Ναυτικῆς Ἐγκυκλοπαιδείας. p. 214. OCLC 31255024.
