= Mopsium =

Town and polis (city-state) of Pelasgiotis in ancient Thessaly

Coordinates: 39°47′15″N 22°25′14″E

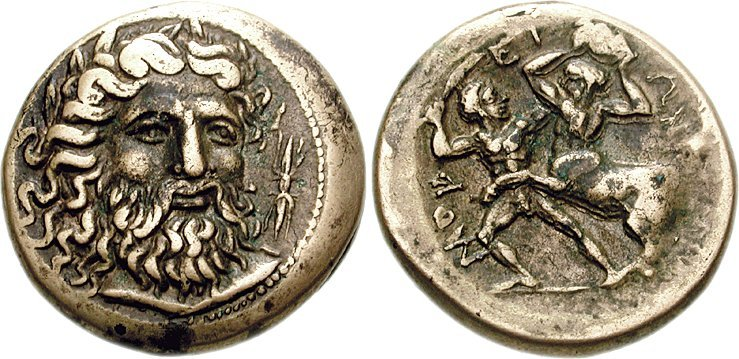
A coin of Mopsium

Mopsium or Mopsion (Ancient Greek: Μόψιον) was a town and polis (city-state) of Pelasgiotis in ancient Thessaly, situated upon a hill of the same name; which, according to Livy, was situated midway between Larissa and the Vale of Tempe. Strabo relates that the origin of its name it was by a Lapith called Mopsus who traveled, according to Greek mythology, with the Argonauts in search of the Golden Fleece. Livy writes that during the Third Macedonian War, Mopsium was the scene of a battle between Romans and troops of Perseus of Macedon, which ended with a victory of the Romans. Livy tells that the dead of the Macedonian troops had been about 8,000, the prisoners, 2,800, and the standards captured by the Romans, 27; while the Romans lost about 4,300 men and 5 standards.

The city minted bronze coins in the 4th century BCE, with the legends «ΜΟΨΕΙΩΝ» and «ΜΟΨΕΑΤΩΝ».

The site of Mopsium is located at the modern site named Stenon Rhodias.
