= Eureaioi =

Possible ancient Greek city-state

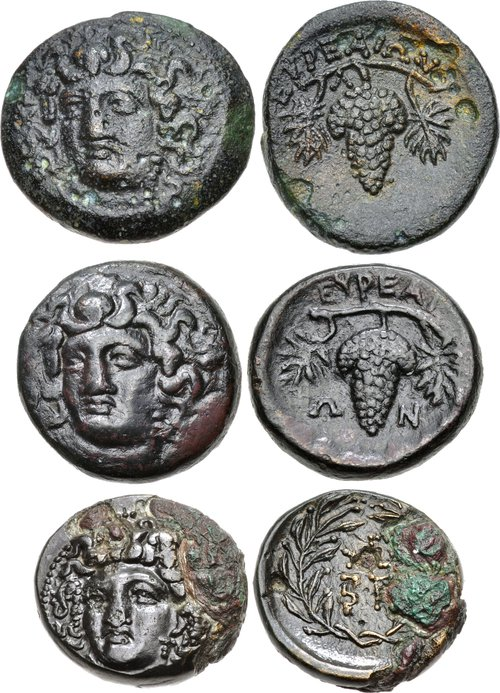
Eureaion coins from Thessaly

Eureaioi (Ancient Greek: Εὐρεαῖοι) (or Eurea [Εὒρεα]; perhaps even Eureai [Εὐρεαῖ]) is the assumed name of a "possible" ancient Greek city-state of Magnesia or Pelasgiotis in ancient Thessaly. The name Εὐρεαῖοι is not attested, but originates indirectly from minted coins dated to the 4th century BCE bearing the legend «ΕΥΡΕΑΙΩΝ» (considered a demonym). Several scholars have made a few suggestions about the community's location, or have connected it with other existing ancient towns in the area.
