= Mondaea =

Coordinates: 39°58′04″N 21°56′02″E

Mondaea or Mondaia (Ancient Greek: Μονδαία) was a town and polis (city-state) of Perrhaebia in ancient Thessaly. The city appears in an epigraph dated to 375-350 BCE in a list of Perrhaebian towns that offered a joint dedication to Apollo Pythios. It also appears in a decree of proxenia of the year 178 BCE in an inscription at Gonnus.

Its location has been found near modern Loutro Elassonos.
