= Balanus (Gaulish prince) =

Ancient Gaulish prince

Balanus was a Gaulish prince beyond the Alps, who sent ambassadors offering to assist the Romans in the Third Macedonian War, 173-169 BCE.
