= Minye =

Minye (Ancient Greek: Μινύη) was a town in ancient Thessaly. It is mentioned in an inscription dated to the 2nd century BCE from Pelasgiotis. It is unlocated.
