= Siege of Aiginion =

Battle of the Third Macedonian War

- Part of The Third Macedonian War
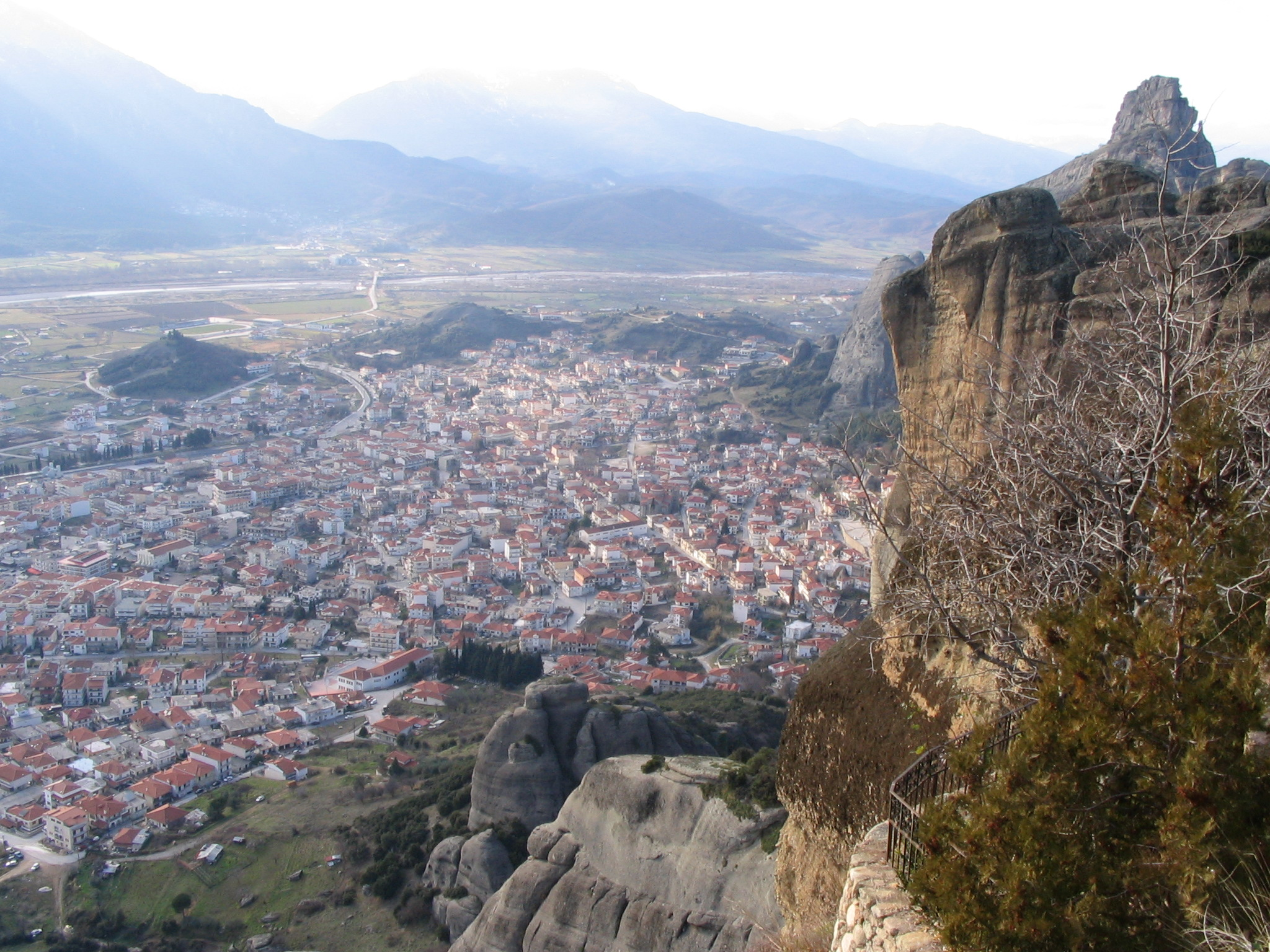
- View of Kalambaka, modern city on the spot of Aiginion
Date	168 BC
Location	Modern day Kalabaka
Result	Roman victory
Territorial changes	Aiginion was conquered by the Roman Republic

Belligerents
Roman Republic	Macedonian kingdom

Commanders and leaders
Lucius Aemilius Paullus Macedonicus	Unknown

Strength
Unknown	1,000 garrison

Casualties and losses
Unknown	Heavy

The siege of Aiginion took place in 168 BC in today's Kalabaka between the Roman Republic and the Macedonian Kingdom. Aiginion was described as a town with formidable defenses, so much so that in 197 BC the Roman General Titus Quinctius Flamininus chose to bypass the town due to its formidable defenses. The siege ended in Roman victory, and the town was subsequently destroyed. The Romans killed everyone they saw.

== Sources ==
1. Polybius

2.John Foss 2001, THE THIRD MACEDONIAN WAR and THE BATTLE OF PYDNA (168 BC)

3. Paul K. Davis, 100 Decisive Battles from Ancient Times to the Present: The World’s Major Battles and How They Shaped History (Oxford: Oxford University Press, 1999), 51.

4. Livy’s History of Rome (32,15,4)

5.Plutarch, Aemilius Paullus

6. Monuments of our town: From the ancient Aiginion and the Byzantine Stagoi to our modern town (Kalambaka 2002), 21
