= Kondaia =

Ancient Greek city state

Kondaia or Kondaea or Condaea (Ancient Greek: Κονδαία) was a city and polis (city-state) in the district of Pelasgiotis of ancient Thessaly.

It is mentioned by Herodotus as the birthplace of Cineas, king of Thessaly who sent a thousand horsemen in aid of the Peisistratids of Athens in the face of an attack by the Spartans, at the end of the sixth century BCE.

Its location is doubtful. A settlement near the current Falani and another near Bakrina, two places of Pelasgiotis have been suggested as possible sites of the city, with the Bakrina location (39°47′55″N 22°23′48″E) the more likely candidate.
