= Sycurium =

Town of ancient Thessaly

Coordinates: 39°42′54″N 22°43′58″E

Sycurium or Syk[o]yrion (Ancient Greek: Συκ[ο]ύριον) was a town of ancient Thessaly in the district of Pelasgiotis, at the foot of Mount Ossa. Livy writes that during the Third Macedonian War, Perseus of Macedon encamped at Sycurium, between Mount Ossa and the lower Peneus; it overlooked the plains of Thessaly and was not far from Larissa.

Its location is near the modern village of Neromylo Agias (or Neromyli). Archaeology has revealed an acropolis with 5th century BCE fortifications and no defensive wall of the lower town.
