= Monument of Aemilius Paullus =

Coordinates: 38°28′57″N 22°30′06″E

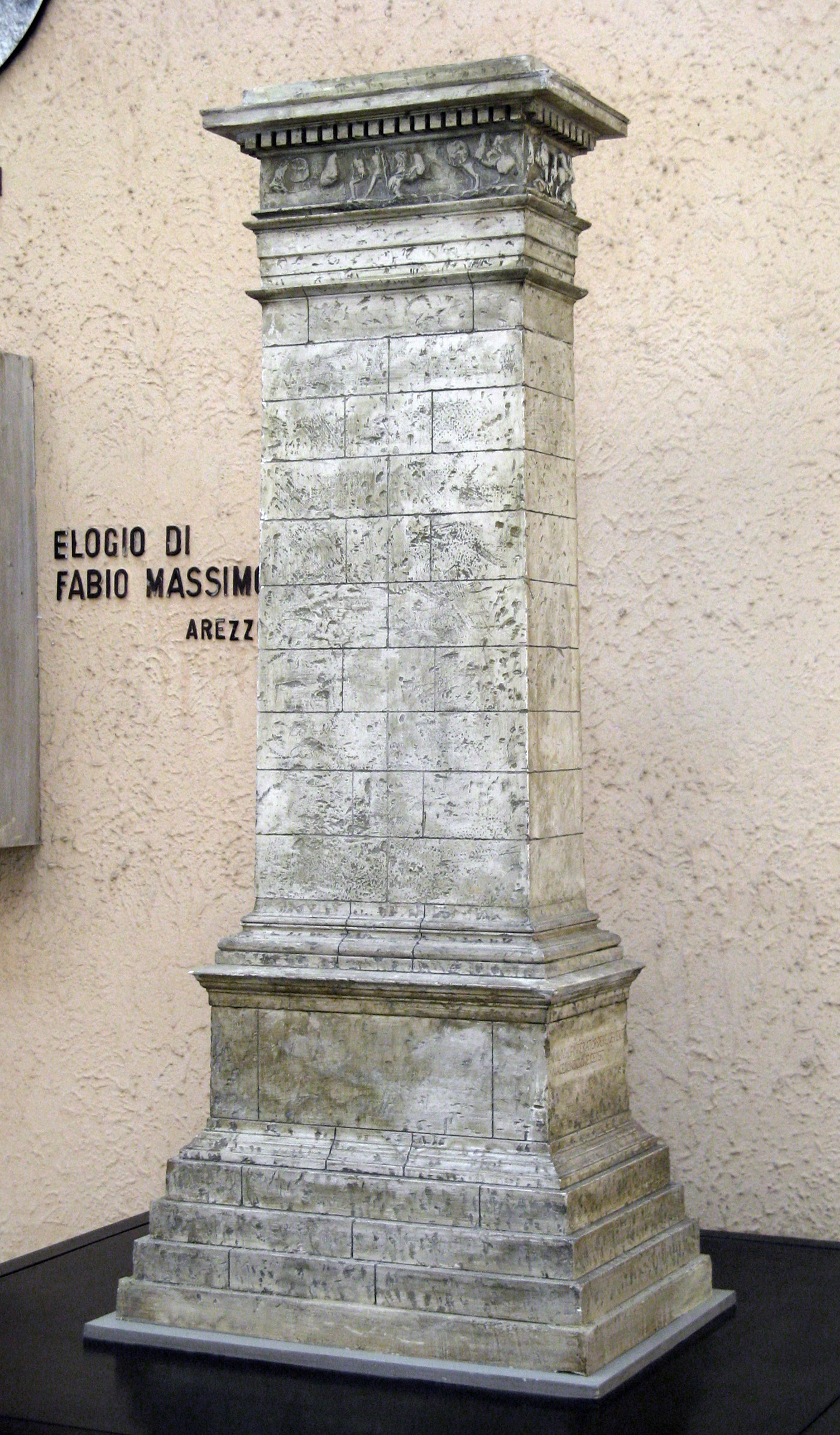
Model of the monument (Museum of Roman Civilization, Rome)

Plan of the Sanctuary of Apollo at Delphi; the Monument of Aemilius Paullus is no. 27

The Monument of Aemilius Paullus was erected in the Sanctuary of Apollo at Delphi shortly after 167 BCE in order to commemorate the Roman victory over King Perseus of Macedon at the Battle of Pydna. It incorporated an incomplete pillar originally intended as a base for a portrait of King Perseus, which would have established the Macedonian presence in Delphi and reminded the Delphians of the tradition of friendship between them and the royal family. Aemilius Paullus repurposed the king's monument to celebrate himself and Rome's victory, noting that "it was only proper that the conquered should give way to the victors." The Monument of Aemilius Paullus stood in front of the Temple of Apollo along with two other commemorative pillars to Eumenes II of Pergamon and Prusias II of Bithynia. However, this pillar dominates over the other two. The completed monument had a bronze equestrian statue that sat on top of a rectangular pillar over 9 meters high. Although the bronze statue that originally sat atop the pillar no longer remains, the cuttings in the plinth show that the horse would have been in a rearing position. An inscription at the base of the pillar survived, L(ucius) Aimilius L(uci) f(ilius) inperator de rege Perse / Macedonibusque cepet, which translated, reads, "Lucius Aemelius, son of Lucius, Imperator, took it from King Perseus and the Macedonians."

== Significance of the monument ==
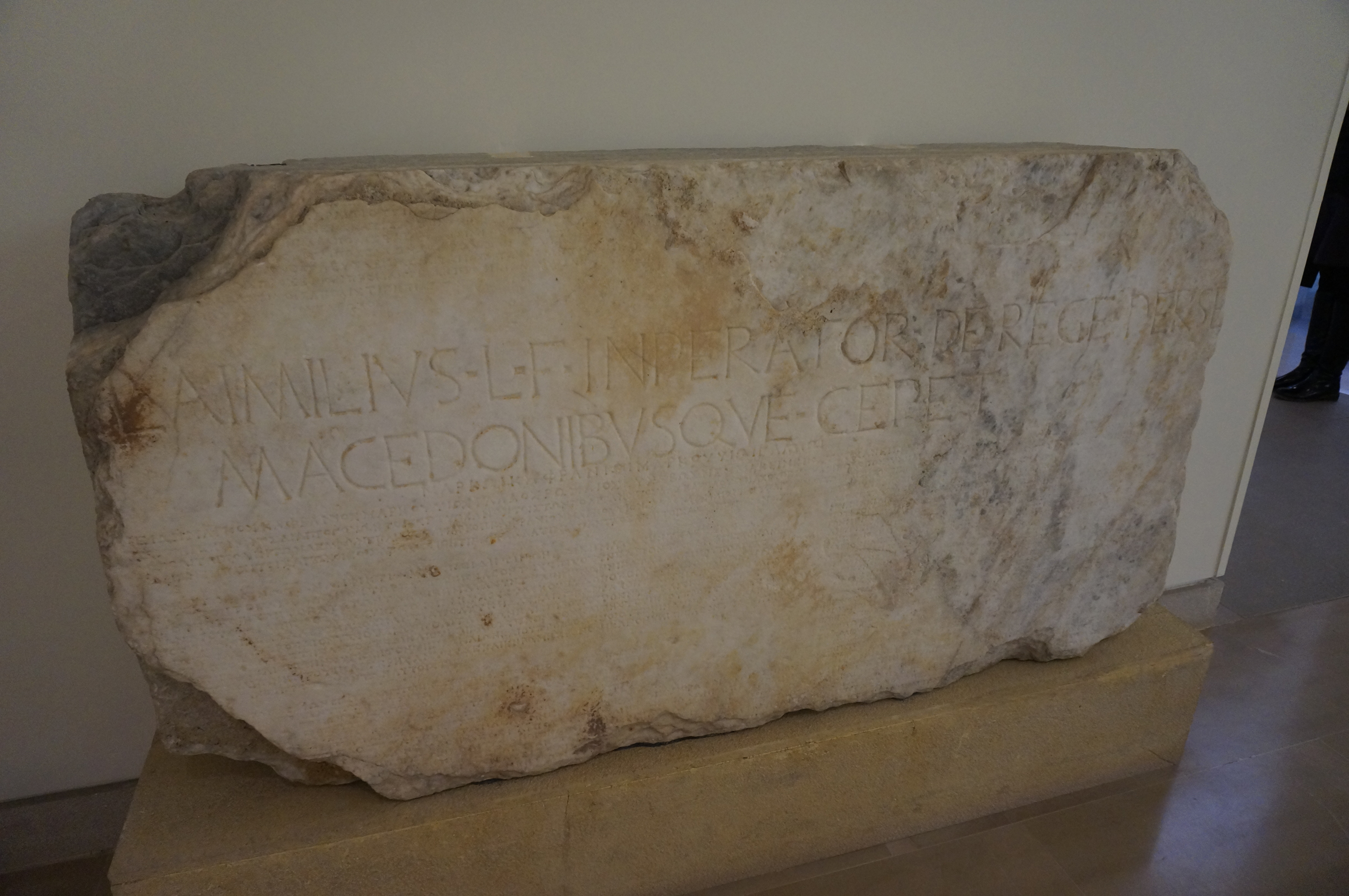
Inscription from the monument (CIL I, 622)

The creation of this monument symbolized that the Romans, who had been intervening in Greek affairs for some time, were now a permanent presence in Greece. Roman patrons dictated its subject matter and style of presentation, which lacked parallels in prior Greek art despite the piece being made by Greek sculptors. The monument and its message of Roman superiority were guaranteed a large audience, since Delphi was a center of trade and cultural exchange and its Temple of Apollo was a major spiritual hub.

Given the fact that the monument was carved out of one originally meant to honor the King Perseus of Macedon and transformed into a monument celebrating the Roman general and statesmen, Aemilius Paullus, a few ideas can be interpreted. Firstly, the Romans were effectively attempting to erase Greek history in this. This may have served to imply that it was unimportant, or at the very least, less important than Roman history. To do this would have also implied that the figures both versions of the monument intended to honor were of equal importance. Thus, equating a Roman general to a Greek king, and therefore the consequential notion that any Roman king to exist was far superior to a Greek king.

== Details and significance of the frieze ==
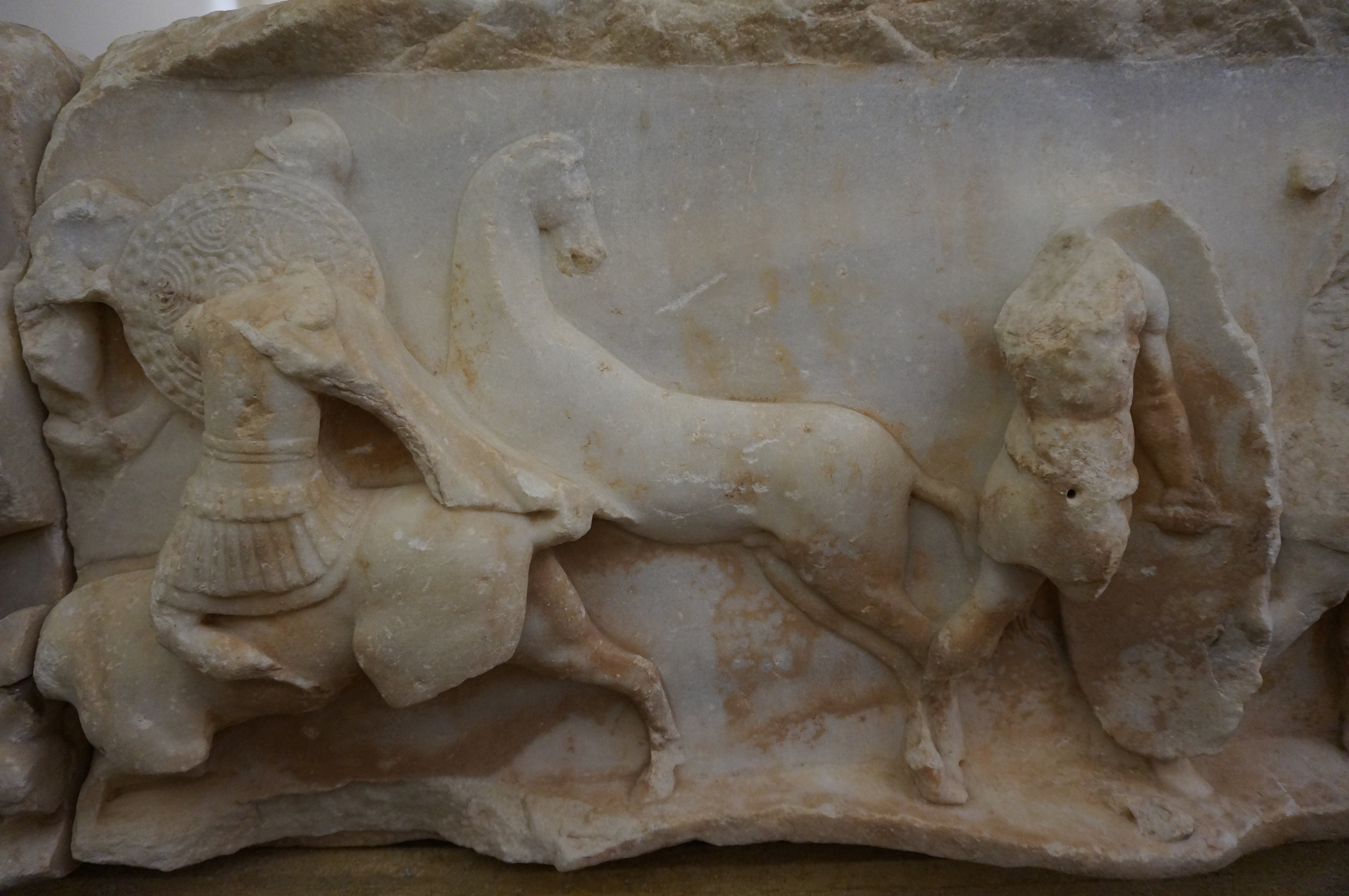
A scene from the frieze: (from left to right) Macedonian cavalryman and infantryman, riderless horse, Italian infantryman

Deployed on all four sides at the top of the rectangular marble pillar is a relief frieze depicting the Battle of Pydna. The frieze runs 6.5 meters long and 0.31 meters high. The figures are carved in high relief out of white veined marble with a brown patina. The frieze is the earliest known example of Greek sculpture in a purely Roman context. The Hellenistic style reliefs are the first surviving sculpture that depicts a Roman historical narrative. There is no landscape or context filling the space, the relief only depicts the two armies in combat, both on foot and horseback. In between scenes of combat lie dead or dying warriors. Battle scenes are made lively with foreshortening from the rear and a strong attention to detail. The two sides can be distinguished by differentiating detail in the armor and weapons. The Romans carry large oval shields (scuta) while the Macedonians' shields are rounded. Nude warriors, once thought to be heroic nudes of fallen Romans, are probably Celtic mercenaries serving under Perseus.

On one side of the frieze, a riderless horse appears dominating the scene. This alludes to the story that said the battle developed from pickets skirmishing over an escaped horse (or mule). Legends said an oracle predicted that whichever side started the battle would lose. Before the battle, a Roman horse got loose and ran towards the opposition, which caused Perseus to assume the Romans had initiated battle. When he attacked in return, Perseus then started the battle himself. For this reason, the riderless horse indicates that the relief specifically depicts the Battle of Pydna, opposed to some generic scene of combat between the Romans and Macedonians. Some suggest that each panel should be read as a different phase of the battle, from the initial skirmishing to the final rout. Taylor argues that the four reliefs together were intended to depict a single scene of Roman victory, and that the prominence of cavalry throughout alludes to the successful mounted pursuit of fleeing Macedonians after the phalanx had broken.
