= Elateia (Thessaly) =

Town in ancient Thessaly

Map showing ancient Thessaly. Elateia is shown to the upper centre.

Elateia or Elatia (Ancient Greek: Ἐλάτεια) was a town in Pelasgiotis in ancient Thessaly, described by Livy, along with Gonnus, as situated in the pass leading to the Vale of Tempe. Elateia is called Iletia by Pliny the Elder, and Iletium or Iletion (Ἰλέτιον) by Ptolemy. It is mentioned by Stephanus of Byzantium under its right name.

Its site in unlocated.
