= Agathagetus =

2nd-century BC Rhodian politician

Agathagetus (Ancient Greek: Ἀγαθάγητος) was a Rhodian who recommended his state to espouse the side of the Romans at the beginning of the war between Rome and Perseus of Macedon, 171 BC during the Third Macedonian War.
