= Abrupolis =

2nd-century BC king of the Thracian Sapaei

- King of the Thracian Sapaei
- Reign: 2nd century BC

Abrupolis (Ancient Greek,"Ἀβρούπολις") (fl. 2nd century BC) was a king of the Thracian Sapaei, and ally of the Romans. He attacked the dominions of Perseus of Macedon, eldest son of the recently deceased Philip V of Macedon, around 179 BC, and laid them waste as far as Amphipolis, as well as overrunning the gold mines of Mount Pangaeus. He was afterwards driven out of his holdings by Perseus, the conflict of which helped ignite the Third Macedonian War, since Rome took issue with the ousting of an ally from his territories.

While some ancient (and modern) writers considered Abrupolis's routing by Perseus a primary cause of the Third Macedonian War, other, later Roman writers, and modern scholars, tended to look upon it as an act of self-defense, with Rome merely using it as one pretext for a quarrel with Perseus.
