= Astymedes =

Ancient Rhodian ambassador to Rome

Astymedes (Ancient Greek: Ἀστυμήδης) was a man of ancient Greece from Rhodes who was sent as an ambassador by his people to Rome on several occasions.

On the breaking out of the Third Macedonian War between the Romans and Perseus of Macedon in 171 BCE, he advised his countrymen to side with the former. After the war, in 167 BCE, when the Rhodians were threatened with hostilities by the Romans for their actions during the war, Astymedes was sent with Philophron (or Philocrates) as ambassadors to Rome to placate their anger. There, Astymedes delivered a speech that successfully de-escalated the conflict, and he was seemingly so proud of the achievement that he later transcribed and circulated a written version of the speech he gave before the Roman senate.

The tenor of this speech was criticized by the historian Polybius in his book The Histories, wherein he describes Astymedes as exaggerating the previous Rhodian contribution to and support of Rome while minimizing that of the other Greek states (of whom Polybius was a partisan). Polybius describes Astymedes as being like "a conspirator who denounces his accomplices". An account by the historian Livy suggests that Astymedes's speech was more of an apology, and more realistic about the faults of Rhodes.

Three years afterwards, he was again sent as ambassador to Rome, and succeeded in bringing about an alliance between the Romans and Rhodes.

In 154 BCE, an "Astymedes, son of Theaidetos" was a priest of Athena Lindia, and some time later, a priest of Helios, though consensus is not unanimous that the priest Astymedes is indeed the same Astymedes who was an envoy to Rome, and not a roughly contemporaneous Rhodian who happened to share the name.

In 153 BCE, on the occasion of the war with Crete, we find him appointed admiral, and again sent as ambassador to Rome.
