= Third Macedonian War =

War between Rome and Macedonia, 171–168 BC

- Part of the Macedonian Wars
Date	171–168 BC
Location	Thessaly, Ancient Macedonia and Illyria
Result	Roman victory
Territorial changes	Macedon divided into four merides (Amphipolis, Thessalonica, Pella, and Pelagonia)

Belligerents
Roman Republic; Attalid kingdom Thessalian League; Achaean contingents Thesprotians; Chaonians; Aetolian contingents Contingents from other Greek allies Illyrian Kingdom (up until 169 BC)	Macedonia; Odrysian kingdom Molossians (from 170 BC); Athamania; Cretan contingents Aetolian contingents Contingents from other Greek allies Illyrian Kingdom (since 169 BC)

Commanders and leaders
Publius Licinius Crassus (171 BC); Aulus Hostilius Mancinus (170 BC); Quintus Marcius Philippus (169 BC); Lucius Aemilius Paullus (168 BC); Eumenes II of Pergamon	Perseus of Macedon; Cotys IV of the Odrysian Kingdom (Thrace); Euander; Archedemus of Aetolia; Gentius

Casualties and losses
Unknown	150,000 Molossians enslaved

The Third Macedonian War (171–168 BC) was a war fought between the Roman Republic and King Perseus of Macedon. In 179 BC, King Philip V of Macedon died and was succeeded by his ambitious son Perseus. He was anti-Roman and stirred anti-Roman feelings around Macedonia. In 172 BC, a Roman commission visited Perseus and required of him concessions which meant the extinction of his independence. Upon his refusal to comply with the demands they returned home and Rome declared war.

Most of the war was fought in Macedon as well as neighbouring Thessaly, where the Roman troops were stationed. After an inconclusive battle at Callinicus in 171 BC, and several years of campaigning, Rome decisively defeated the Macedonian forces at the Battle of Pydna in 168 BC, ending the war.

Rome's victory ended the Antigonid dynasty and brought an effective end to the independence of the Hellenistic kingdom of Macedon, although formal annexation was some years away. The kingdom was divided into four client republics, called merides, with capitals located at Amphipolis, Thessalonica, Pella, and Pelagonia, which were members of a federal league, the League of the Macedonians. Roman prestige and authority in Greece greatly increased.

== Background ==
In 179 BC, King Philip V of Macedon died and his ambitious son, Perseus, ascended the throne. In pursuit of an alliance, Perseus married Laodice, the daughter of Seleucus IV the king of the Seleucid Empire. Perseus' daughter was set to marry Prusias II of Bithynia (in north-western Anatolia, modern Turkey), who was an enemy of Eumenes II of Pergamon (in western Anatolia), an ally of Rome.

Amid these alliances, Abrupolis, the king of the Thracian tribe of the Sapaeans and an ally of the Romans attacked Macedon, laid it waste as far as Amphipolis, and overran the gold mines of Mount Pangaeus. He was repulsed and then driven out of his territories by Perseus. This conflict contributed to the tensions that led to war, because Rome took issue with the ousting of its ally.

Perseus made an alliance with Cotys IV, the king of the Odrysian kingdom, the largest state in Thrace. He enlarged his army. He also announced that he could carry out reforms in Greece and restore its previous strength and prosperity. Perseus sent agents to seek support in the Greek states and cities. He gained the support of Greeks who were treated generously, saw Perseus as their kindred, were keen on revolutionary change, or did not want to be at Rome's mercy. Perseus' propaganda and political manoeuvres around Greece created bitter disputes between pro-Roman and pro-Perseus factions.

At the beginning of 173 BC, the Romans sent commissioners to Aetolia and Macedonia, but they were not given the opportunity to meet Perseus. The Romans surmised that he was preparing for war. Aetolian cities experienced increasingly violent internal conflicts. A Roman envoy attended the session of the Aetolian council at Delphi. He asked both factions to abstain from war. This was agreed through an exchange of hostages, who were sent to Corinth. The envoy then went to the Peloponnese and called a meeting of the Achaean council. He praised the Achaeans for retaining an old decree forbidding the Macedonian kings to approach their territories, and emphasized that Rome considered Perseus an enemy. Violent conflict erupted in Thessaly and Perrhaebia (the land of the Perrhaebi, a tribe in northern Thessaly). This was exacerbated by a debt problem. Rome sent an envoy to try to defuse the situation. He managed to do so by addressing indebtedness "swollen by illegal interest" in both areas.

Eumenes II of Pergamon, who had been in conflict with Macedon and who disliked Perseus, made a speech in the Roman senate with the aim of precipitating hostilities. The contents of the speech were kept secret and emerged only after war's end. He claimed that Perseus had been preparing for war since the day of his accession. He was respected and feared in the east and had influence on many kings. He mentioned Prusias of Bithynia, who was an enemy of Pergamon, asking for the hand of Perseus' daughter. He also mentioned that Antiochus IV, the new Seleucid king, betrothed his daughter to Perseus as an example of Perseus gaining influence among kings in the east, even though Antiochus had just renewed his father's alliance with Rome. The Boeotians had never made an alliance with Macedon. Members of the Achaean council threatened to call on Rome in their opposition to an alliance with Perseus. If not for this, such an alliance might have happened.

Perseus made preparations for war by storing corn for 30,000 troops, stockpiling weapons, and accumulating funds to hire 10,000 mercenaries in addition to many soldiers from Thrace. He seized some places and persuaded others through favour. Eumenes II claimed that if Rome ignored these developments, Perseus might attack Italy.

A few days after Eumenes' speech, the senate received envoys from Perseus. They said that Perseus had not said or done anything hostile. However, the senators did not believe this and "their ears had been captured by Eumenes". They felt affronted when the leader of the embassy said that if Perseus saw that the Romans were bent on an excuse for war, he would respond with courage and that "the chances of war were the same for both sides and the issue was uncertain". When they returned to Macedon they told Perseus that the Romans were not preparing for war, but they were so embittered with him that they might do so soon. Perseus thought that this might be possible. He was determined to begin the war by shedding the blood of Eumenes, whom he hated, and called for Euander, a leader of Cretan mercenaries, and three Macedonian killers to arrange Eumenes' assassination.

The cities of Greece and western and central Anatolia became convinced that Eumenes was steering Rome towards war. They sent emissaries to Rome. One of them was from Rhodes. It said that they felt sure that Eumenes had included Rhodes among those he accused of being friends of Perseus and, therefore, Rhodes had tried to confront Eumenes in the Roman senate. As this had failed, they accused Eumenes of trying to stir the Lycians (a people in western Anatolia under Eumenes' rule) against Rhodes and claimed that he was more oppressive than the Seleucid king. The senators resented this claim. Hostility towards Eumenes by various Greek states made Rome more determined to favour him.

The plan to assassinate Eumenes failed during his visit to Delphi. Gaius Valerius Laevinus, who had been sent to investigate the situation in Greece and monitor Perseus, returned to Rome and supported Eumenes' allegations. He also bought a woman who was involved in the failed plot and a Roman who claimed that Perseus had tried to coerce him into poisoning ambassadors to Rome. Perseus was declared a public enemy, the Senate elected to wage war and dispatched an army to Apollonia on the western coast of Greece to occupy the coastal cities. The war was, however, put off. Eumenes also prepared for war.

Gentius, king of the Illyrians, brought himself under suspicion, but had not gone so far as to decide which side to support. The Thracian Cotys IV, king of the Odrysian Kingdom, the largest state in Thrace, had already declared for Macedon.

== Preparations ==
The consuls for 171 BC were Publius Licinius Crassus and Gaius Cassius Longinus. Macedon was assigned to Publius Licinius and the command of the fleet was assigned to praetor Gaius Lucretius.

Two legions were assigned for Macedon, each number 6,000 instead of the usual 5,200. Allied troops numbering 16,000 infantry and 800 cavalry accompanied them. Envoys were sent to confer with the Greek states. They received the support of Epirus, in western Greece, and Aetolia and Thessaly, in central Greece. The main Boeotian cities, though divided between a pro-Roman and a pro-Perseus faction, decided to break the treaty with Perseus to side with Rome. This broke up the league of Boeotian cities as some of them supported Perseus. In Rhodes a new leader, and some locally notable citizens such as Astymedes, persuaded the island to ally with Rome. Gentius, the king of Illyria, remained non–committal.

A commission was sent to Greece. Perseus invited one of the commissioners, Marcius, for a meeting. He denounced Eumenes' allegations and others and claimed that his international relations were not aimed at preparing for war. Marcius advised him to send an embassy to Rome and arranged an armistice to guarantee safe passage. He did this because Rome was not ready for war. The army was preparing and had not yet gone to Greece.

Many senators were pleased with the commissioners' diplomatic achievements. However, the older senators disapproved of the new policy of diplomacy, which they saw as not reflecting Romans' honour and courage and called for military action. As a result, 50 ships were sent to Greece and 2,000 troops were sent to occupy Larissa, the capital of Thessaly, to prevent Perseus from garrisoning it. Perseus' ambassadors arrived in Rome to argue for peace. The senate was not persuaded and they were ordered to leave Rome.

Fleet commander Gaius Lucretius set off with 40 ships. He received ten vessels from allies in southern Illyria at Dyrrhachium (modern Durrës, Albania) and 54 light vessels from Gentius, which he assumed had been assembled for the Romans. He reached Cephallania (Cephalonia, an island in the Ionic Sea) where he was joined by seven ships from Roman allies. He then went to Corfu. The consul crossed the sea from Italy and encamped with his force near Apollonia.

Perseus assembled his whole army at Citium. He had 39,000 infantry, half of which were phalanxes (heavy infantry). The force included 3,000 Cretans, 3,000 men from Agrianes, Paeonia and Parstrymonia (a Thracian area around the River Strymon, in modern Bulgaria), 3,000 Thracians, 2,000 Gauls, 3,000 Macedonian cavalry, 1,000 Thracian cavalry, and 500 men from various Greek states.

== 171 BC ==
Perseus marched to Perrhaebi in the northernmost district of Thessaly and seized the main towns north of the River Peneus, which crosses northern Thessaly: Cyretiae, Mylae, Elatia and Gonnus. He encamped at Sycurium, between Mount Ossa and the lower Peneus. It overlooked the plains of Thessaly and was not far from Larissa. Meanwhile, Publius Licinius had marched from Epirus on the west coast of Greece through arduous mountain passes and through Athamania, a kingdom allied with Perseus. He was lucky that they were not attacked, otherwise the green troops tired from their journey would have been defeated. He reached Thessaly and encamped at Tripolis Larisaia, five kilometres north of Larissa and further up the Peneus. He was joined by 4,000 infantry and 1,000 cavalry brought by Eumenes II of Pergamon and 1,500 infantry and 600 cavalry.

A contingent of the Roman fleet went through the Gulf of Corinth and fought the Boeotians. It besieged Haliartus with 10,000 mariners and 2,000 troops under one of the brothers of Eumenes II. Eventually the city fell; 2,500 fighters who had taken refuge in the citadel were sold as slaves and the town was razed.

Perseus sent a detachment twenty miles southward to ravage the fields of Pherae in southern Thessaly. He hoped that this would draw the Romans forward, but they did not respond. Perseus then appeared just over a mile from the Roman camp and sent forward a reconnaissance unit of 100 cavalry and 100 slingers. The Romans sent out a detachment of some 380 Gallic, Mysian and Cretan light cavalry. Perseus deployed only four cavalry squadrons and four infantry cohorts, and engaged the Roman detachment. Livy wrote that, as the two forces were equal in numbers and "no fresh troops came up on either side, the engagement ended in a drawn battle". Perseus then returned to Sycurium. Neither side wanted a large-scale battle and for Perseus, this was something of a test. Moreover, his men had marched for twelve miles without water. Perseus returned the next day, bringing water carts. He lined up before the Roman camp, but the Romans did not give battle. He returned several times to the same spot and at the same hour. He hoped that the Roman cavalry would pursue his troops, so that he could attack it with his superior cavalry while it was away from the Roman camp. As this failed, he moved his camp five miles away from the Roman camp. The next day he lined up for battle at dawn. As this was earlier than he had usually done, it surprised the Romans. Perseus engaged the Romans by a hill called Callinicus.

=== Battle of Callinicus ===
Perseus' left wing included Thracians intermixed with cavalry and the right wing consisted of Cretan infantry intermixed with Macedonian cavalry. The wings were flanked by a mix of Macedonian cavalry and allied troops of various nationalities. The centre held the "sacred” cavalry fronted by slingers and javelin throwers. Publius Licinius lined up the heavy infantry inside the rampart and the light infantry and the cavalry in front of it. The right wing had light infantry intermixed with Roman cavalry and the left wing had light infantry and cavalry of Greek allies. In the centre were select cavalry with Eumenes' troops, 200 Gauls and 300 Cyrtians. The Thessalian cavalry of 400 was a short distance in front of them. Eumenes, his brother Attalus, and their infantry were in the rear, just in front of the rampart. The armies' numbers were even.

The battle was started by the slingers and javelin throwers. Then the Thracians attacked the Roman cavalry on the right wing, throwing it into confusion. The infantry on both sides cut the lances of the horsemen and stabbed the sides of the horses. Perseus' centre pushed back the Greeks on the left wing. The Thessalian cavalry, which had been kept in reserve, joined the Eumenes' men at the rear and their combined ranks provided a safe retreat for the allied cavalry. As the enemy's pursuit slackened, the Thessalians ventured forward to protect the retreat. The Macedonian forces, which had become spread out, did not close with the enemy, which was advancing in compact formation. The Macedonian phalanx now came forward without Perseus' orders. The Roman infantry came out of the rampart. On seeing it advancing, Cretan commander Euander advised Perseus that continuing the battle was an unnecessary risk, and the king decided to withdraw. Despite this, the battle was considered a Macedonian victory because they lost 400 infantry and 20 cavalry, while the Romans lost 2,000 infantry and 200 cavalry. On Eumenes advice, Publius Licinius moved his camp across the river for protection. In the Roman camp the Aetolians were blamed for beginning the panic that spread to the Greek troops, who fled following their example. Five Aetolian officers were sent to Rome. The Thessalians were commended for their bravery.

Perseus moved his camp to Mopselus, a hill at the entrance of the Vale of Tempe that commanded the plain of Larissa. Meanwhile, Misagenes (the son of Masinissa, king of Numidia) brought 1,000 Numidian cavalry, the same number of infantry and 22 elephants for the Romans. Perseus was advised to use the victory to secure an honourable peace. This would make him look moderate and if the Romans rejected it, they would look arrogant. Perseus approved. Envoys were sent to the consul. They promised to pay tribute which would be negotiated. The reply was that peace would be granted only if Perseus put himself in the hands of Rome and gave her the right to determine his future and that of Macedon. Perseus hoped to buy the peace by various offers of higher and higher sums of money, but Publius Licinius turned them down. Perseus returned to Sycurium, preparing to resume hostilities. Meanwhile, the Romans in Boeotia, having taken Haliartus, moved to Thebes, which surrendered without fighting. The city was given to the pro-Roman party and the property of the pro-Macedonians was sold.

Perseus viewed the fact that the Romans were harvesting corn and dumping straw in front of their camp was a good opportunity to torch the camp. However, his night incursion was discovered. Perseus withdrew amidst skirmishes with pursuing Romans. The Romans moved to Crannon (modern Krannonas, to the south-east of Larissa) to reap more corn. They saw Perseus' cavalry and infantry on the hills overlooking the camp. As the Romans did not move, he returned to Sycurium.

The Romans moved to Phalanna (the capital of the Perrhaebi of northern Thessaly) for further harvesting. Perseus learned that they were dispersed and that no one was guarding the camp. He hurried with 1,000 cavalry and 2,000 Thracian and Cretan light infantry and caught the Romans by surprise. He captured nearly 1,000 carts and 600 men. Then he attacked a detachment of 800 Romans, which withdrew on a hill and formed a circle with interlocked shields to protect against javelins. The Macedonians surrounded the hill, but could not make their way up. The Macedonians used cestrosphendons, a weapon that had just been invented. It was like a dart with feathers round the shaft shot by a sling held by two thongs. The slinger whirled it and it flew off. The Romans were getting tired and Perseus urged them to surrender. Pulbius Licinius was informed and he responded with a force of light infantry and cavalry, including the Numidians and the elephants, followed by more troops.

Perseus called in the heavy infantry, but it was too late. They arrived in a hurry and were not properly arrayed. Publius Licinius attacked and Perseus lost 300 men and 24 of the "sacred” cavalry, including its commander. The heavy infantry fled, but got tangled with the captured Romans and their carts in a narrow passage. Unable to get through, the men threw the carts down the hill. The king showed up and, to the soldiers' dismay, ordered them to march back. Livy noted that according to some sources the consul returned to his camp, while according to others a big battle ensued in which 8,000 enemies were killed, including two commanders, and 2,800 were captured, while Romans lost 4,300 men.

Perseus left a strong garrison in Gonnus and returned to Macedon for the winter. He sent a governor to Phila to try to win over the Magnetes (a tribe to the east of Thessaly) and went to Thessalonica with king Cotys IV, the Thracians' commander. They heard that Autlebis, the chief of a Thracian tribe (possibly the Caeni) and Corrhagus, one of Eumenes' commanders, had invaded one of Cotys' territories. Perseus let Cotys go to defend it and gave his cavalry only half of the year's pay. Publius Licinius heard that Perseus had gone, and launched a failed attack on Gonnus in order to deny the Macedonians a convenient descent into Thessaly. He took towns in Perrhaebia, including Malloea and Tripolis, and returned to Larissa.

The consul sent part of the army to various cities to winter, disbanded the forces of the Greek allies except for the Achaeans and sent Misagenes and his Numidians to the nearest cities in Thessaly. Eumenes and Attalus returned to Pergamon. He then went with part of his army south to Achaean Phthiotis where he razed Pteleum. Antronae surrendered. Livy wrote that then he went to Larissa, that the Macedonian garrison had fled and that the inhabitants, who had taken refuge in the citadel, surrendered. Oddly, he had not previously mentioned that Larissa had been taken by the Macedonians. After this Publius Licinius went to Boeotia, where Thebes was in trouble with another Boeotian city, Coronea, and asked for help.

The commander sent to Illyria by the consul attacked two towns. He seized Cerenia and initially allowed the inhabitants to keep their belongings, in order to encourage the strongly fortified city of Carnuns to go over to him. However, he did not succeed and later sacked Cerenia. The other consul, Gaius Crassus, achieved little in northern Italy and unsuccessfully tried to go to Illyria and attack Macedon. The senate was astonished that he had left northern Italy exposed to possible attacks and sent envoys to warn him not to attack anyone without authorisation.

== 170 BC ==
Livy wrote that Publius Licinius, frustrated with his lack of success, turned against the Boeotians, mercilessly plundering several cities there, where he was wintering. The people of Coronea put themselves under the protection of the Senate, which ordered Licinius to release his captives. Gaius Lucretius was even more ruthless and rapacious, described by Livy as "oppressive to the allies, despicable in the sight of the enemy". Perseus, in a surprise attack on the Roman fleet stationed at Oreum on the island of Euboea, captured five warships and twenty transports laden with corn, and sunk the other ships. He then went to Thrace to help Cotys. Molossians in Epirus, on the west coast of Greece, went over to the Macedonians.

The consuls for 170 BC were Aulus Hostilius Mancinus and Aulus Atilius Serranus. Macedon was assigned to Aulus Hostilius and the fleet and the coast of Greece to the praetor Gaius Hortensius.

Aulus Hostilius was on his way to Macedon via Epirus. An Epirot leader wrote to Perseus to tell him to hurry there. However, the king was delayed. If he had attacked at the river passage, the newly recruited troops would have been defeated. In any case, Aulus Hostilius was informed and changed his route. He left Epirus and sailed to Anticyra (on the north coast of the Gulf of Corinth, in Boeotia) and marched to Thessaly. He immediately marched, but he was defeated. He gave up his useless attempts first to force his way through Elimea in south-western Macedon and secretly marched through Thessaly. Perseus anticipated his moves. Livy wrote that Gaius Hortensius did not conduct his naval operations "with sufficient skill or success, for none of his acts deserves better to be remembered than his cruel and perfidious plundering of the city of the Abderites when they endeavoured to avert, by entreaty, the intolerable burdens imposed on them". Perseus made an incursion against Dardania in southern Illyria, killed 10,000 and seized a large booty.

An embassy from Chalcis (chief town of Euboea) came to Rome to complain about Gaius Lucretius (for plundering the city, a friend of Rome), and the current commander, Lucius Hortensius, for keeping the rowdy sailors in the town. Lucretius was put on trial and fined by the plebeian tribunes; the senate ordered Hortensius to free the men enslaved by Lucretius and to move the sailors off the island.

It was suspected that Gentius might side with Perseus. Therefore, the senate sent eight ships with 2,000 soldiers to Issa. Aulus Hostilius sent Appius Claudius to Illyria with 4,000 men to protect the neighbouring states. He gathered 8,000 soldiers and sent them to Lychnidus, in the territory of the Dassaretians, a tribe in Epirus. Messengers from the nearby Uscana—a town allied with Perseus and garrisoned by Cretans—told Appius Claudius that some people in the town were willing to hand it over to him. He neither asked for hostages as a safeguard nor sent scouts. He encamped near the city and set out at night, leaving 1,000 men to guard the camp. The troops were not well organised, stretched out in a long and irregular line. They became separated in the dark. They did not see anyone on the walls as they approached. However, the defenders made a sortie, killing many of the Romans; only 1,000 escaped. Appius took the remains of his force to Lychnidus without taking care of the stragglers.

This and other reverses were reported to Rome. The senate ordered two deputies to gather information on the situation in Greece. The deputies reported the successes of Perseus and the fear of the Greek allies about Perseus reducing many cities. They also reported that Publius Licinius' troops were, thin because he had granted leave to many of them, in order to gain popularity.

== 169 BC ==
=== Opening stages ===
The consuls for 169 BC were Quintus Marcius Philippus (for the second time) and Gnaeus Servilius Caepio. The Macedonian War was assigned to Quintus Marcius and the command of the fleet to praetor Quintus Marcius Figulus. The troops allocated for Greece were 6,000 Roman infantry, 6,000 Latin infantry, 250 Roman cavalry and 300 allied cavalry. The old soldiers were discharged, so each legion had 6,000 soldiers. The soldiers granted leave were recalled. The recruitment for the fleet was 1,000 Roman freedmen and 500 Italians and 500 Sicilians.

When the snow covered the mountains of Thessaly, thus protecting Macedon from Roman attacks, Perseus attacked the Illyrians, who had granted free passage to the Romans. King Gentius had been wavering about whom to support. Perseus moved to the land of the Penestae (in southern Illyria) and went on to Stubera with 10,000 infantry, 2,000 light infantry, and 500 cavalry. From there, he marched on Uscana. In his discussion of the war's third year, Livy stated that Uscana apparently switched allegiance to Rome. The mixed Roman and Illyrian garrison refused to surrender and Perseus besieged it. The defending commanders soon capitulated, and asked to be allowed to leave with their weapons. Perseus agreed, but then disarmed them. He moved the population to Stubera and sold them as slaves. The 4,000 enemy troops were sent to various towns. He then marched on Draudacum, whose garrison surrendered, and then took eleven forts, capturing 1,500 Romans. He seized Oaeneus, killed the men and put the women and children in custody. He sent envoys to Gentius, to seek an alliance. Gentius said he did not have enough money for war. Perseus, who had a reputation as a miser, sent the envoys back but did not mention money, even though he had the proceeds from the slave sale. Perseus ravaged Ancrya, returned to Uscana, fortifying it, and then returned to Macedon.

Lucius Coelius, a commander in Illyria, remained inactive while Perseus was there. After Perseus returned to Macedon, Coelius tried to recover Uscana, but was repulsed and returned to Lychnidus. He sent a detachment to the area to receive the hostages from the cities which had remained loyal (they were sent to Apollonia) and from the Parthini (a tribe of southern Illyria), who were sent to Dyrrhachium (modern Durrës, Albania). Perseus was invited by the Epirots to attack Aetolia and marched on Stratus, the strongest Aetolian city, with 10,000 infantry and 300 cavalry. He could not pitch camp on the snow-covered Mount Citium and had to encamp elsewhere. He then was held up at the River Aracthus because of its deep water. He built a bridge, crossed, and then met Archidamus, a distinguished Aetolian, who had persuaded the nobles to betray Stratus. However, while he was away, the pro-Roman faction called in a Roman garrison. Dinarchus, the commander of the Aetolian cavalry, also arrived with 600 infantry and 100 cavalry to support Perseus, but when he saw the changed situation he switched allegiance to Rome. Due to the winter weather, Perseus abandoned Stratus, and went to Aperantia, which, through the influence of Archidamus, willingly surrendered. Archidamus was made its governor, while Perseus returned to Macedon.

Appius Claudius was eager make up for his defeat in Illyria and attacked a stronghold in Epirus. He had a force of 6,000, Romans and contingents of Thesprotians and from Chaon (both from Epirus). He was repulsed by the garrison. He besieged the city, but then lifted it due to a report that Perseus was marching there. He was pursued up an almost impassable mountain and lost 1,000 men, in addition to 200 captured. He then encamped on the plain. The pursuers were joined by an Epirot force that ravaged the area; 1,000 troops of the city of Antigonea were killed and 100 were captured in an ambush. They then encamped near Appius Claudius, who decided to go back to Illyria. He sent the soldiers to winter camps and returned to Rome.

=== Spring ===
In early spring consul Quintus Marcius sailed with 5,000 men to reinforce his legions. They disembarked at Ambracia and moved towards Thessaly. Figulus took his fleet into the Gulf of Corinth. He left his ships at Creusis and traveled to join the fleet stationed at Chalcis overland. Aulus Hostilius, who had been protecting Rome's allies, had restored discipline in his troops and was encamped in Thessaly; he handed over his troops and returned to Rome. The consul started marching towards Macedon. Perseus sent troops to the mountain passes into Macedon.

Quintus Marcius carried out a heroic march into Macedon through the Olympus mountains . He sent 4,000 light infantry ahead to secure the road to a pass near Octolophus, but the road was so difficult and steep that they advanced only fifteen miles and seven miles the following day. They spotted an enemy camp guarding the pass. Quintus Marcius stopped on a hill, which gave a wide view and ordered one day's rest. The next day he attacked with half his troops. The enemy had seen the Roman camp and was ready. The narrow ridge allowed for the deployment of only small numbers of light troops and so the engagement was limited to a skirmish. Perseus, who was not far, did not intervene or send more troops. Despite the presence of the enemy, Quintus Marcius had no choice but to persist. Leaving some troops to guard the summit, he marched across trackless places, having sent forward a party to open a road, with allied troops protecting them while clearing the way through the forests. Marcius kept the cavalry and baggage before him and closed the rear with his legions. The descent from the hill felled pack animals. Elephants threw off their riders and roared loudly, frightening the horses. A series of bridges (made with two long posts fastened to the earth to which ten-yard-long beams were attached) was made where the rocks were steep, in order to help the elephants. The Romans advanced only seven miles, and then waited for the troops at the camp to join them. On the fourth day they reached a pass and encountered similarly difficult terrain. As they approached the plain troops encamped between Heracleum and Libethrus, while some occupied a valley and part of the plain. The greater part was on hillsides.

Perseus panicked. He evacuated the area and its strong posts, leaving them to the Romans, even though the area was easily defensible. He ordered the inhabitants of Dium, where he was encamped, to move to Pydna and moved his statues there. Quintus Marcius advanced, facing a difficult decision. The Romans could leave the area only through two passes: through the Vale of Tempe to Thessaly or on to Macedon by way of Dium, and both were guarded. The Romans could not withdraw to Thessaly lest they cut their supply lines. Furthermore, the Vale of Tempe was a difficult passage, dangerous even if not guarded. The precipices on both sides were steep and the passage was so narrow that it barely allowed a loaded horse. To make matters worse, guard detachments occupied four places along the pass. One was at the entrance, another in a thick forest and the third on the road where the valley was narrowest (Livy did not specify the characteristics of the fourth). The only way to retreat or receive supplies was to recross the mountains, but they were also difficult. It was also hard to pass unnoticed as the enemy was posted on the heights. The only option was the area between the bottom of Mount Olympus and the sea, but that was only one mile wide, half of which was the bog of the mouth of the River Baphirus and a large part of the remaining plain was taken up by the town. The small remaining space could easily closed by a short rampart with towers; construction material was abundant.

=== Thessaly campaign ===
Quintus Marcius ordered Spurius Lucretius, who was in Larissa, to capture the deserted forts around Vale of Tempe. He sent scouts to check the roads around Dium and then he marched to the city. It was so rich and well-fortified that Quintus Marcius could not believe his luck that it had been evacuated. He continued his march, forcing the surrender of Agasse. To get a good reputation he did not garrison it and did not ask for taxes. He moved on to the river Ascordus, but, as he got further away from the supplies from Thessaly, plunder became scant and provisions were scarce, so he returned to Dium. The Roman fleet arrived, but he was told that the transport ships were in Magnesia, further south. He was informed by Lucretius that the forts he had taken were stocked with corn. Quintus Marcius moved his headquarters to Phila to distribute corn to the soldiers. Livy noted allegations that he had withdrawn because of fear that had he stayed he would have had to risk battle, and that he let his gains slip. With his withdrawal Perseus marched back to Dium, rebuilt the fortifications the Romans had pulled down, and encamped on the bank of the Enipeus to use it as a defence. Meanwhile, Quintus Marcius sent 2,000 men from Phila to seize Heracleum, halfway between Dium and the Vale of Tempe, and moved his quarters there, as if he intended to besiege Dium. Instead, he prepared for the winter and had roads built for the transport of supplies from Thessaly.

Figulus sailed from Heracleum to Thessalonica. He pillaged the countryside and repulsed sorties from the towns, employing naval catapults. After this, the troops were re-embarked, and he made for Aenia, fifteen miles away, and pillaged its fertile countryside. He then sailed to Antigonea and did the same, but a Macedonian detachment intercepted the troops and killed 500 men. Another fight by the coast, assisted by men from the ships, had the Romans kill 200 enemies. The fleet sailed on to the district of Pallene (Chalkidiki peninsula), whose territory was by far the most plentiful. There, Figulus was joined by 20 ships from Eumenes II and five ships from Prusias I of Bithynia. This encouraged him to besiege Cassandrea, which connected the Pallene peninsula (one of the three long peninsulas that extend from the Chalkidiki peninsula) to the territory. An attack was repulsed by the city garrison. The arrival of a Macedonian ship from Thessalonica with Gallic auxiliaries ended the siege. The Romans and Eumenes considered besieging Torone, but changed their minds because of its garrison. They went on Demetrias, but they saw that the walls were fully manned. Thus, they brought the fleet into harbour at Iolcos, after pillaging the countryside.

To remain active, Quintus Marcius sent 5,000 men to Meliboea by Mount Ossa, where it stretches out into Thessaly to command Demetrias. Works for a siege started. Perseus heard about this attack and sent one of his commanders with 2,000 men. His instructions were that if he could not dislodge the Romans at Meliboea he was to march on Demetrias before Figulus and Eumenes moved there from Iolcos. When the Romans at Meliboea saw him arriving they burnt the siege works and left. The Macedonians hurried to Demetrias. Figulus and Eumenes reached the walls of the city. Negotiations between Eumenes and Antimachus were rumoured, via the governor of the city and a Cretan, Cydas. Ultimately, the Romans left. Eumenes sailed to visit the consul and then returned to Pergamon. Figulus sent part of the fleet to winter at Sciatus and went to Oreum in Euboea with the rest of the fleet because it was a better base from which to supply Macedon and Thessaly. Livy noted different accounts about Eumenes. According to one he did not assist Figulus, even though he had asked for it. When he left for Pergamon he was not on good terms with the consul. Quintus Marcius could not get him to leave his Gallic cavalry behind.

Ambassadors from Bithynia and from Rhodes went to Rome to propose peace. The Bithynians said that their king had promised Perseus to mediate for peace and asked the senate to give him this role. The Rhodians said that during the interwar period they had started a friendship with Perseus which they broke unwillingly because Rome wanted to draw them into an alliance. Now the war disrupted their trade, brought losses in port duties and in provisions and caused scarcity on the island. They said that they wanted peace and that they had also sent envoys to Perseus. They would consider what measures to take against either party who insisted on carrying on the war. This message was considered arrogant. Livy cited one source claiming it was ignored while others wrote that the senate replied that the Rhodians and Perseus had conspired against Rome and that the words of the ambassadors confirmed this. Once Perseus had been defeated, Rome would consider retribution.

== 168 BC ==
The consuls for 168 BC were Lucius Aemilius Paulus (for the second time) and Gaius Licinius Crassus. Macedon was assigned to Lucius Aemilius and the command of the fleet was assigned to the praetor Gnaeus Octavius. The praetor Lucius Anicius was put in charge of Illyria.

=== Preparations ===
Aemilius carefully prepared his campaign. He asked for a commission to find out if the troops were still in the mountains or had descended to the plain, to inspect the armies and the fleet, to report on what was required, whether the allies were still loyal, which states were hostile, the status of Perseus' troops, and the logistics. They reported that the Romans had advanced towards Macedon, but that travel mountains had proven costly. Perseus was still holding his country and the two forces were close to each other. The Romans had rations for only six days. The Roman position in Illyria was perilous and needed to be reinforced or withdrawn. A strong enough army there could open a second front. Some of the fleet's crew had died of disease and some had gone home, leaving the ships undermanned; also, the men did not have proper clothing and had not received their pay. The senate decided that two new legions of 5,000 infantry each were to be taken to Macedon. The men in Macedon who were unfit for service were to be discharged, the two legions there were to have 6,000 infantry each and the rest of the men were to be sent to the various garrisons. The forces of the Roman allies were to be 10,000 infantry and 800 cavalry. For the fleet 5,000 sailors were to be levied.

=== Perseus' opportunities ===
A year earlier Gentius was invited to join Macedon in an alliance. He had told Perseus that he did not have money for war. When he felt pressured by the Romans, he offered Gentius 300 silver talents if hostages were exchanged. Perseus sent an envoy to Gentius who gave him his sworn sword and the hostages. Gentius sent an envoy of his to Perseus to get his sworn sword, the hostages and the talents, which was to be collected by men who accompanied him. After receiving all of these he was to travel to Rhodes with Macedonian envoys to deliver a plea by the two kings for Rhodes and her powerful navy to join them against the Romans. Perseus went to meet the Illyrians, the hostages were exchanged and the treaty concluded. The men who were to receive the money were sent to the royal treasury in Pella. The Illyrian and Macedonian ambassadors were ordered to board a ship at Thessalonica, where they were joined by a Rhodian who stated that the Rhodians were ready for war; he was made head of the joint delegation. Perseus let the Illyrians in Pella take the talents and had 10 talents sent to Gentius. However, he got his men to carry the money and told them to proceed slowly and to wait for his instructions when they reached the border. Gentius, who had received only a small part of the money, was urged to provoke the Romans into an attack. As a result, he imprisoned two Roman envoys. Perseus, believing that Gentius had now been pushed into war with Rome, told the couriers to take the money back to his treasury. Livy wrote that, through his avarice, Perseus had lost an alliance with Gentius backed by large army of Gauls. When the Macedonian and Illyrian envoys reached Rhodes, the Rhodians thought that Perseus and Gentius were still allies and that the Gauls had been hired. This strengthened the leaders of the pro-Macedonian faction who declared that Rhodes had sufficient authority to put an end to the war and that the kings had to accede to peace.

Perseus also sent a common message to Eumenes II and Antiochus IV, which invited them to pressure the Romans for peace talks. The message to Antiochus was sent openly. The one to Eumenes was sent under the pretence of ransoming prisoners. Secret deals transpired between the two that raised suspicions in Rome and triggered accusations that Eumenes II was a traitor. This was also related to Cydas, who was Eumenes' close friend. He went to meet a countryman who served Perseus at Amphipolis, in Macedon, and then had conversations with two of Perseus' officers at Demetrias. He had gone to Eumenes as an envoy twice. The fact that these secretive missions had taken place was notorious, but the precise nature of their dealings was not known.

Perseus also approached Eumenes II of Pergamon directly, even though he was an enemy of Macedon. Eumenes knew that Perseus pursued peace. He also thought that as the war dragged on the Romans would be interested in bringing it to an end. He wanted to win their good graces by helping them to secure what he thought would come about of itself. He asked a price on 1,000 talents for not helping the Romans by land or sea and 15,000 talents for mediating peace. Perseus agreed to send his hostages to Crete. He said that he would pay the money only when the deal was complete and that meanwhile he would send it to Samothrace, an island which belonged to him. Eumenes agreed, but asked for part of the sum immediately. He struggled to obtain it. Livy commented that "having manoeuvred with each other to no purpose, they gained nothing but disgrace”, and that, but for a small amount of money, Perseus missed a chance for successful peace talks or, had they failed, the ignition of hostilities between Rome and Eumenes.

Through avarice Perseus also lost a chance to hire Gallic mercenaries. A body on infantry and cavalry of Gauls who lived in the Balkans offered its services to Perseus for money. Perseus went to one of his camps with a small amount of gold to give to a few of the men hoping that this would entice the others. He got an envoy to tell the Gauls to move their camp to a place near Macedon. The Gauls asked whether the gold had been brought. There was no reply and they said that they would not move unless they received the gold. Perseus gave his officers the excuse that the Gauls were savages and that he would hire only 5,000 cavalry, which were enough for war and not too many to be dangerous, in order to justify not wanting to spend money on the whole of the Gallic body. When the Gauls heard that only 5,000 cavalry and no infantry were going to be hired, the rest of their army was disgruntled. The Gallic chieftain asked whether the 5,000 men would receive the agreed pay, but received an evasive answer. The Gauls left, devastating part of Thrace as they went. Livy thought that this large force of effective fighters could have been used effectively in combined operations with the forces of Perseus, which could have put the Romans in an untenable position.

=== War in Illyria ===
Gentius assembled his entire force of 15,000 at Lissus and sent his brother Caravantius with 1,000 infantry and 50 cavalry to subdue the Cavii while he besieged Bassania, five miles away, which was an ally of Rome. Durnium opened its gates while Caravandis closed them and Caravantius ravaged the fields. The peasants killed many of the scattered plunderers. Appius Claudius had strengthened his army with units of Bulinian, Apollonian, and Dyrrhachian contingents and left his winter quarters. He was encamped near the river Genusus. Praetor Lucius Anicius had arrived in Apollonia and sent a letter to Appius, asking him to wait for him. Three days after, he arrived at the camp with 2,000 infantry and 200 Parthinian cavalry. He prepared to march into Illyria to relieve Bassania. However, he was delayed by a report that 80 enemy boats were ravaging the coast. The relevant passage of Livy is missing, but it can be deduced that he defeated this fleet (presumably, the Roman fleet was nearby), that he moved on to Bassania and that Gentius fled to Scodra, the most strongly fortified city in the area and was protected by two rivers and the whole of the Illyrian army. Despite this, Lucius Anicius prepared for battle by the city walls. Instead of manning the walls, which would have given them an advantage, the Illyrians marched out and gave battle. They were pushed back and more than 200 men crowded by the gate fell. The Illyrians asked for a truce and were given three days. Gentius then surrendered. A few days later he was sent to Rome.

=== Lucius Aemilius' campaign ===
Perseus sent 200 cavalry to guard the sea and ordered 200 targeteers in Thessalonica to encamp close to the naval arsenal. He sent 5,000 troops to garrison the mountains of Pythium and Petra, which were close to Thessaly, to guard against a Roman advance. He fortified the banks of the River Elpeus because it was dried and thus easy to pass. Women of nearby cities were ordered to bring provisions. Aemilius encamped nearby.

The envoys from Rhodes arrived at the Roman camp to advocate for peace, but they encountered hostility. Aemilius told them that he would give them an answer in two weeks and discussed battle plans with his war council. He ruled out trying to force a crossing of the river or to get Octavius to devastate the coast near Thessalonica, as he considered the fortifications insurmountable. He heard from two local traders that Perrhaebia (near the Pythian mountain range) was poorly guarded. He thought that a night attack could dislodge the enemy detachments. He sent for Octavius and told him to sail to Heracelum and store ten days' rations for 1,000 men. He sent Publius Scipio Nasica Corculum there with 5,000 soldiers. He told Nasica privately that this was a pretence: Nasica would board the fleet, as if to raid the coast, but, in fact, he would then disembark and march to the mountains—the rations were for enabling the troops to move faster, without having to forage. Aemilius scheduled the march so that Nasica would reach the Pythian mountains three days later. Livy said that Nasica had 5,000 troops. However, Plutarch noted that Nasica wrote in a letter that he had 5,000 Roman and 3,000 Italian infantry, 120 cavalry and 200 mixed Thracians and Cretans. When he reached Heracleum, Nasica told his officers the real design and moved inland to Pythium. According to Plutarch, he stopped below Pythium while Livy wrote that he reached the summit. Livy wrote that Aemilius sent his son, Quintus Fabius Maximus Aemilianus, with Nasica. Plutarch specified that the son volunteered to join the expedition.

Plutarch wrote that Perseus did not know about these movements, because Aemilius remained in his position quietly. Livy did not state this about Perseus and gave an account of Aemilius opening two battles to keep Perseus distracted from the covert operation. Both authors wrote that a Cretan deserter informed Perseus, who sent 2,000 Macedonians and 10,000 mercenaries to Pythium. In Plutarch's account they went to occupy the mountain passes. Livy's account implies that they were sent to the pass Nasica was to attack, then guarded by 5,000 Macedonian troops. He added that Nasica said that the steep descent would have been so unguarded that it would have been taken without trouble had it not been for the deserter. Both authors noted that Polybius (in a lost part of book 29 of his Histories) stated that Nasica attacked when they were asleep, but that Nasica wrote (in that letter) that in a tough fight he had killed a Thracian mercenary and that their leader disgracefully threw away his armour and cloak and fled. The Romans pursued the enemy to the plain.

Livy described battles fought by the River Elpius. Aemilius offered battle in the morning of the day after Nasica's departure. The ground of the river bed was over a mile wide and uneven, which hindered the heavy infantry. The Macedonians hurled javelins and rocks from their rampart. Aemilius withdrew at noon. He attacked again the next morning and withdrew later than the day before. On the third morning, he went to the lowest part of the camp, "as if intending to attempt a passage through an entrenchment which stretched down to the sea …” The rest of this passage is lost. After the defeat at the Pythian mountains, Perseus withdrew to Pydna, pitching camp in the plain between the rivers Aeson and Leucus, shallow in the summer, but still deep enough to trouble the Romans. The even ground was favourable for the phalanx. The light infantry could withdraw to nearby hills after harassing the enemy and then to attack again.

Nasica re-joined his commander and Aemilius marched on Pydna, where he lined up the men in battle formation. However, at noon he ordered them to mark the line of a camp and deposit the baggage because it was hot, the men were tired from the march and they were greatly outnumbered. Nasica advised Aemilius to fight. He replied that he had learnt when it was "proper to fight, and when to abstain from fighting." He had lined up the men to keep the construction of the camp rampart behind them hidden from the enemy. He then withdrew them behind the rampart starting from the rear. Aemilius placed the camp on uneven ground, which left the Macedonian phalanx unable to operate. A veteran officer announced an eclipse for that night, and reassured the soldiers who would have seen it as a portent.

Aemilius performed sacrifices when the moon arose and through most of the next day. Plutarch wrote that this was because, although familiar with eclipses, he was devout and sought divination, not expiation. During the eclipse, he sacrificed eleven heifers to the goddess moon. During the day he sacrificed twenty oxen to Hercules without obtaining favourable omens. With the twenty-first the signs indicated victory if the Romans kept on the defensive. Livy wrote that the officers thought that Aemilius, who had hoisted the battle signal at dawn, was wasting time with these sacrifices.

=== Battle of Pydna ===
The battle of Pydna resolved the war decisively in the Romans' favour. Plutarch noted two versions of the beginning. According to some sources Aemilius goaded the enemy into attacking first; the Romans made a horse without a bridle run to the enemy's bank and sent some men to pursue it to provoke an attack. Other sources said that Thracian troops came upon Roman pack animals that were bringing in forage; 700 Ligurians sallied against them. Both parties sent reinforcements, starting a general fight. Aemilius went to the front line with legionaries. Livy recounted the horse version and added that this was because the omens of Aemilius' last sacrifices said that the Romans would win only if they did not strike the first blow. However, Livy favoured another version and thought that the battle started by happenstance. Both sides collected water from a river closer to the Macedonian camp. The Roman side was protected by Italian allies: two cohorts of Marrucini and Paeligni and two squadrons of Samnite cavalry. More troops (of Vestini and men from Firmum and Cremera) and two cavalry squadrons (of men from Placentia and Aesernia) were stationed in front of the camp. While both sides were quiet, a mule broke loose and escaped towards the enemy's bank. Three Italians went into the river to pursue the animal. Two Thracian soldiers dragged it towards their bank. The Italians pursued them and secured the mule, killing one of Thracians, then returned to their post. Some of the 800 Thracians chased the Italians and soon, the rest engaged with the enemy guards. Units from both sides joined in and the king and the consul mobilised their forces. Livy wrote that whether by the design of Aemilius or by accident, this is what sparked the battle.

Aemilius decided to turn an accident into an opportunity and brought his forces into the fight. Nasica told him that Perseus was advancing. The Thracians, flanked by light infantry, formed the first line. Next to them there were mercenaries of various nationalities. The Leucaspides (phalanx with white shields) formed the middle. In the rear there were the Chalcaspides (phalanx with bronze shields), flanked on the right by another phalanx. These two were the main strength of the army. There were also targeteers, who were midway between the phalanx and the light infantry. They had spikes like those of the phalanx but wore light armour. They stood in front of the wings. This army had been so swift that those who were first killed fell close to the Roman camp. A unit of Paelignans from central Italy and those at their rear were routed and the rest of the soldiers in that part of the battlefield withdrew to a hill. Elsewhere the Roman forces were hesitant to confront the long spears of the Macedonian phalanx, which pierced both their shields and armour.

The strength of the Macedonian phalanx relied on keeping its lines compact by interlocking their shields. Aemilius noticed that the phalanx was not compact everywhere and that in some places there were gaps. These were due to the length of its lines, the unevenness of the ground (which caused those on higher ground to become separated from those on the lower ground) and differences between those who were faster and those who were slower or those who were slowed down, pressed by the enemy. Aemilius ordered his cohorts to attack any gaps, however narrow, and slip through like a wedge to break up the ranks of the phalanx and divide the battle into separate confrontations. The wedged-in troops attacked the flank of the phalanx where it was not protected by the spears and the sides of the soldiers was not shielded by their breastplates. They also cut off the lines they attacked by falling on their rear. The efficiency of the phalanx was lost. Forced to engage in man-to-man fights or fights between small detachments, the Macedonians had to turn their spears, which were unwieldy because of their length and weight. They became tangled with each other and lost effectiveness. Their small daggers could not hack the enemy shields or oppose their swords. They were not a firm body anymore and were thrown into disarray.

The legion of Aemilius wedged in between the phalanxes and targeteers and had the targeteers behind and the Chalcaspides in front. Lucius Albinus, a former consul, was sent against the Leucaspides of the centre of the enemy lines. The elephants and the allied cavalry were sent to the right wing, by the river, where the battle began. This was also the area where the Macedonians started to retreat. This attack was followed by an attack on the left wing by the Latin allies, who pushed it back. The second legion charged the centre, broke the lines of the enemy and dispersed it. Plutarch wrote that Marcus, the son of Cato the Elder and Aemilius' son-in‑law, lost his sword. He rallied his companions to his aid, who put themselves under his leadership, and attacked. They filled gaps that were hidden by hips of fallen bodies. They fought 3,000 elite Macedonians who remained in close ranks and slaughtered them. The battle ended at four o' clock and was won in one hour. The rest of the day was spent pursuing fugitives over the course of three miles. Plutarch wrote that the Macedonians lost 25,000 men and noted that according to Poseidonius the Romans lost 100 men while according to Nasica they lost 80.

Livy stated that the Macedonians suffered the greatest losses in any battle with the Romans and that if the battle had started earlier, the Romans would have had more daylight time to pursue the Macedonians and all their troops would have been destroyed. The Macedonian wings fled in full ranks. The survivors of the hemmed-in phalanx fled unarmed to the sea. Some went into the water begging the Roman ships to save them. They walked further into the sea or swam towards the boats from the ships, but they were killed. Some headed back to the shore, but they were trampled by the elephants that were moving ashore. The enemy lost 20,000 men, 11,000 were taken captive. The victors lost no more than 100 men, most of whom were Paelignians.

Plutarch recorded that Polybius wrote that Perseus cravenly left the battle immediately and went to the city under the pretext of offering sacrifices to Heracles. Plutarch noted that Poseidonius, who wrote a history of Perseus and said that he participated in the battle, wrote that the king did not leave because cowardice or under the pretence of sacrifices, but because, the day before the battle, he was kicked in the leg by a horse. On the day of the battle, against advice to the contrary, he ordered a pack horse and joined the phalanx without a breastplate. A dart tore his tunic and bruised his skin. Livy, instead, wrote that Perseus was the first to flee the battle with his sacred cavalry squadron. He fled to Pella and was quickly followed by the Thracian cavalry. The Roman forces, busy routing the Macedonian phalanx, were "careless of pursuing the cavalry".

=== Pursuit of Perseus ===
Livy wrote that Perseus fled to Pella through the Pierian wood with his cavalry, which had survived the battle almost intact, and the royal retinue. In the darkness he left the main path with a few trusted men. The abandoned cavalrymen returned to their homes. Plutarch, instead, wrote that he came across infantrymen who called the horsemen cowards and traitors and tried to push them off their horses. He turned away from the road, attempting to be inconspicuous. He carried the royal diadem. These ran away because they were afraid of his cruelty. Perseus reached Pella. He was met at the palace by the governor of Pella and the royal pages (Livy) or was met by his treasurers whom he killed because of bold remarks about the defeat (Plutarch). Perseus' friends, who had escaped to Pella independently, shunned him. Only Euander the Cretan, Archedamus the Aetolian, and Neon the Boeotian remained. Fearing a plot, Perseus continued his escape with an escort of about five hundred Cretans, lured by money. He rushed to cross the river Axius before daylight, because he thought that the Romans would not pursue him beyond this treacherous river. He reached Amphipolis three days after the battle. He sent ambassadors to the Romans. In the meantime, Hippias Milo, and Pantauchus, three of his main friends, had fled to Berœa and surrendered that city and several others. Perseus addressed the people of Amphipolis, but he was met with hostility because of fears that his presence would lead to a Roman attack. He left the city and arrived at Galespus the next day.

In the meantime, Aemilius sent three envoys to Rome to announce the victory. He moved nearer the sea, towards Pydna. Most Macedonian cities surrendered. Pydna had not yet sent ambassadors because military men of different nationalities had fled there and walled the city gates. Milo and Pantauchus were sent to address the situation. The soldiers were sent away and the city was given up for the Roman soldiers to plunder.

Plutarch, who was quite scornful of Perseus, wrote that at Galepsus his fear abated and he reverted to avarice. He claimed that the Cretans had stolen some of the gold plate of Alexander and implored them to exchange it for money. He was playing Cretan against Cretan and those who gave it back to him were cheated. He paid less money than he promised and got the money from his friends. He then sailed to the island of Samothrace where he took refuge as a suppliant in the temple of the Dioscuri, which was a sanctuary.

Perseus' ambassadors reached Aemilius who, thinking that he was in Amphipolis, sent Nasica there with a detachment to obstruct the king. Meanwhile, Gnaeus Octavius, the Roman naval commander, sacked Melibœa. At Aeginium, which was not aware that the war had ended, the inhabitants sortied against Gnaeus Anicius, who had been sent there, and two hundred men were lost. Aemilius left Pydna for Pella. On receiving intelligence that Perseus had gone to Samothrace, he moved to Amphipolis and then crossed the river Strymon and went to Sirae, where he encamped. Three ambassadors gave Aemilius a letter from Perseus which contained appeals for mercy which in Livy's opinion "were anything but kingly". Aemilus did not reply and Perseus sent another letter in which "he begged most urgently" for envoys to be sent to him to confer. Aemilius sent three men, but nothing came of the meeting; "Perseus clung desperately to his royal title, and [Aemilius] was determined that he should place himself and all that he possessed at the mercy of Rome". Meanwhile, Gnaeus Octavius, the commander of the Roman fleet, anchored it off Samothrace and, out of respect to the gods and the sanctuary on the island, did not go for Perseus, but took measures to prevent him from escaping by sea and pressured him to surrender.

Lucius Atilius, "a young man of distinction", was allowed to attend an assembly of the people of the island. He accused Euander, the leader of the Cretan mercenaries, of having attempted to murder king Eumenes II of Pergamon at the sanctuary of Delphi, and called for him to be put on trial. Violence was forbidden at these sacred places. The people of Samothrace, which was also a sanctuary, agreed. If found guilty this would have exposed Perseus as the instigator of the attempted murder. Euander wanted to escape, but Perseus, fearing that the Samothracians would think that he had helped him to escape, had him killed. He then realised that he would be accused of murder in a sanctuary and bribed the leader of the island to say that Euander had committed suicide. However, this alienated the inhabitants, who turned to the Romans. Perseus hired the ship of a Cretan and had all the money he could take secretly transported to the ship at sunset. At midnight he climbed a wall and reached the shore. However, the ship had sailed off as soon as the money was on board. Perseus hid in the temple of Demetrius. Gaius Octavius proclaimed that if the royal pages and all the Macedonians on the island went over to the Romans they would be granted impunity and freedom. They all left Perseus except for his eldest son, Phillip. At this point Perseus surrendered. According to Plutarch, Perseus asked for Nasica, whom he trusted, but he was not there. Thus, he gave himself to Gnaeus Octavius.

Perseus (together with Gentius) was sent to Rome as a prisoner. The motion to award Aemilius a triumph was disputed by an officer who had a personal gripe with him and sought support from the soldiers who felt they had been given less of the share of the booty than they should. Aemilius kept part of this for the treasury. However, the motion was carried and Aemilius celebrated his triumph. Perseus was led in chains in front of the procession and was then kept in custody at Alba Fucens for the rest of his life.

== Aftermath ==
Aemilius sent his son, Quintus Fabius Maximus, who had returned from Rome, to sack Agassae, which revolted after it had surrendered to the consul and asked for an alliance with Rome, and Aeginium, which refused to believe the Roman victory and killed Roman soldiers who entered the town. Lucius Postumius was sent to sack Aeniae "because of its obstinacy".

Commissioners were sent to Macedon and to Illyria. Livy wrote that the senate resolved that the Macedonians and Illyrians should be free "so that it might be clear to all the world that the arms of Rome did not carry slavery to the free, but on the contrary freedom to the enslaved; and also that amongst those nations which enjoyed liberty, the security and permanence of their liberty rested under the protection of Rome". This served Romans' self-image and as propaganda. The contracts for working the rich mines of Macedon and the leases of the royal domains were scrapped and were put under Roman tax collectors. The pretext was that without them "the law lost its authority or the subjects their liberty" and that the Macedonians were unable to work the mines themselves because those in charge would line their pockets and this could cause unrest. Ironically, the Roman tax collectors became notorious for lining their pockets. The Macedonian national council was abolished with the excuse that this was intended to prevent a demagogue from flattering the "mob” and turn the freedom granted by the Romans into a "dangerous and fatal licence.” Macedon was to be divided into four merides: Amphipolis, Thessalonica, Pella, and Pelagonia, each with its own council which would have to pay Rome a tribute which was half of what used to be paid to the king. The same regulations applied to Illyria. More definite arrangements were to be made by the commissioners.

When the commission arrived from Rome, Aemilius gave notice for the representatives of all the cities to assemble at Amphipolis and bring all the documents they had and all the money due to the Royal treasury. A conference was held amid such a display of pomp and power that Livy wrote that it "might have even appalled the allies of Rome". It was declared that the Macedonians were to be free and retain their fields and cities and elect their officials. Then the partition, the borders of the four cantons, and the tribute were announced. Aemilius designated the four capitals. Intermarriage between people of different cantons and the possession of houses or land in more than one canton were banned. Gold and silver mines were not allowed to be mined, but iron and copper ones mining continued. Import of salt and wood cutting for domestic shipbuilding or allowing others to do so were forbidden. The cantons bordering other nations were allowed to have border troops.

The Romans used their victory to increase their control over Greece by supporting pro-Roman factions. Their supporters had come to the conference from all over Greece. They made allegations that many of those who had supported Perseus in their cities and states had fostered hostility towards Rome, claimed that maintaining loyalty to Rome in their states required crushing them, and gave lists of names. The commissioners decided that those on the list had to go to Rome to defend themselves. Livy wrote that the pro-Romans were inflated "to an insupportable pitch of insolence". In Macedon everyone who had been in the king's service was sent to Italy with their children over fifteen.

Aemilius sent Nasica and his son, Quintus Fabius Maximus Aemilianus, to ravage the areas of Illyria that had helped Perseus.

== Enslavement of Molossians ==
After the defeat of the Illyrian king, Lucius Anicius, the commander in Illyria placed garrisons in the Illyrian cities. Then he marched on Epirus to suppress the rebellion there. All the cities except Passaron, Tecmon, Phylacem, and Horreum, surrendered. Passaron was the first to be attacked. Its two leaders had incited Epirus to side with Perseus and told the inhabitants that death was preferable to servitude. A young noble stood against them and encouraged the people to drive the two out of the city, which then surrendered. At Tecmon the city leader was killed and the city surrendered. The other two fell after a siege. When Epirus was pacified and detachments wintered in various cities, Lucius Anicius returned to Scodra, the capital of Illyria, where five commissioners had arrived from Rome. There he summoned leaders from around Illyria to a conference. In agreement with the commissioners, he announced that the Roman garrisons were to be withdrawn from Illyrian cities. Some cities had deserted Caravantius and gone over to the Romans. They were exempted from paying a tribute. Rebel cities were also exempted. The three cities that had resisted the longest were to pay half of the tribute they paid to Gentius. Lucius Anicius also declared that Illyria was to be split into three cantons.

Aemilius went to Epirus on his way back to Rome. The senate gave his army permission to plunder the cities in Epirus that had supported Perseus. Centurions were sent to tell the cities that they had come to remove to the Roman garrisons because the Epirots were to be free. The leaders of each city were summoned and told to bring the silver and gold in their towns to a designated place and that Roman cohorts had been ordered to visit all the cities. Troops were sent to seventy cities. This was coordinated so that they would reach each city on the same day. The precious metals were collected and then the soldiers sacked the cities. The city walls were demolished. The booty was enormous and part of the proceeds from its sale was given to the men of the army, 400 denarii to the cavalrymen and 200 to the foot soldiers. In addition to this, 150,000 people were enslaved. The troops resented that they were not given a share of the booty from the royal palace of Perseus "as though they had not taken any part in the Macedonian war". Aemilius then sailed to Italy with his army. A few days later Lucius Anicius, who had been meeting the representatives of the rest of the Epirots, told them that the senate wanted to hear from some of their leaders and ordered them to follow him to Italy. He then waited for the ships that had transported the army from Macedonia and back to Italy.

== See also ==
- Ancient Greek warfare
- Military history of Greece
- Agathagetus
- Antigonid Macedonian army
