= Kallipefki, Larissa =

Kallipefki Καλλιπεύκη
- Community
- Location within Greece
- Coordinates: 39°58′0″N 22°27′37″E
- Country: Greece
- Administrative region: Thessaly
- Regional unit: Larissa
- Municipality: Tempi

Area
  - Community: 45.4 km^{2} (17.5 sq mi)
- Elevation: 1,054 m (3,458 ft)

Population (2021)
  - Community: 240
  - Density: 5.3/km^{2} (14/sq mi)
- Time zone: UTC+2 (EET)
  - Summer (DST): UTC+3 (EEST)
- Postal code: 400 06
- Area code: +30-2495
- Vehicle registration: ΡΙ

Kallipefki (Greek: Καλλιπεύκη) is a village located on a plateau on the west side of the lower Mount of Olympus, in the prefecture of Larissa and the municipality of Gonni. Kallipefki has a population of about 240 and is located 1,040 m (3,410 ft) above sea level. It is about 9 kilometers from ancient Leivithra, 23 kilometers from the town of Gonnoi, 58 kilometers from Larissa, and 130 kilometers from Thessaloniki.

The name derives from the word "kalli" which means fair/good and "pefko" which means pine, due to the beautiful pine forests that surround it. The old name of the village before 1927 was "Nezeros", which probably derives from the Slavic word "ezer", which means lake. The soil of the plateau of Kalipefki that is fit for cultivation today was created in 1911 after the Askouris (Askourida) lake had been drained. The size of the lake was approximately 5.500 acres.

Kallipefki was founded in late Roman times and was one of the 10th century AD bishop dioceses, dependent on the bishop of Larissa. Due to its strategic location in the lower Olympus mountain, it became an important position of Greek resistance ("thieves") during the Turkish occupation.

Stergios Hatzikostas, a trader who lived in Vienna and is most known for being the editor, publisher and friend of Rigas Feraios was born in Kallipefki in 1760. Some of the touristic sights are "Agia Triada" and "Patomeni"

The "Olympus Storytelling Festival," is held in Kallipefki every two years as a collaboration between the University of Thessaly, the Hellenic Group of Storytelling Friends (POFA) and the Cultural Association of Kallipefki (MESAK).
