= Lucius Aemilius Paullus Macedonicus =

Roman general and statesman (c. 229 – 160 BC)

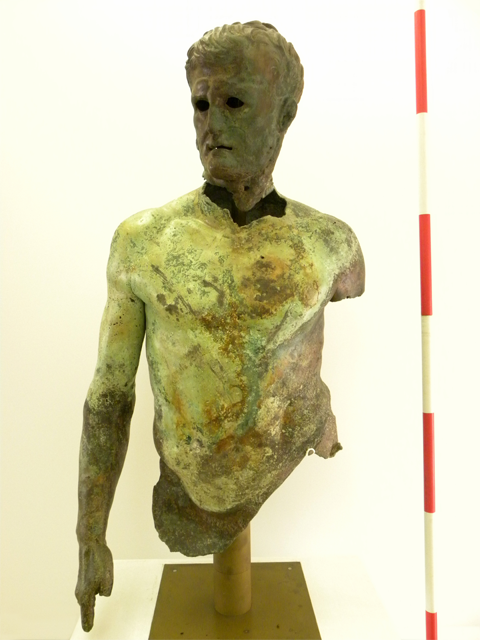
- Ancient bronze statue found in Brindisi, identified as Lucius Aemilius Paullus
- Born: c. 229 BC
- Died: 160 BC
- Office: Consul (182, 168 BC)
- Children: Scipio Aemilianus; Quintus Fabius Maximus Aemilianus

Military service
- Battles/wars: Third Macedonian War ● Battle of Pydna ●Siege of Aiginion
- Awards: Triumph

Lucius Aemilius Paullus Macedonicus (c. 229 – 160 BC) was a consul of the Roman Republic, as well as a general, who conquered the Antigonid kingdom of Macedon during the Third Macedonian War.

== Family ==
Paullus' father was Lucius Aemilius Paullus, the consul defeated and killed in the Battle of Cannae. He was, in his time, the head of his branch of the Aemilii Paulii, an old and aristocratic patrician family. Their influence was immense, particularly due to their fortune and alliance with the Cornelii Scipiones. He was father to Scipio Aemilianus and another son known as Fabius, who were tutored by Paullus' friend Polybius.

== Early career ==
After the fulfillment of Paullus' military service, and being elected military tribune, he was elected curule aedile in 193. The next step of his cursus honorum was his election as praetor in 191. During his term of office, he went to the Hispania provinces, where he campaigned against the Lusitanians between 191 and 189. However, he failed to be elected consul for several years. Paullus was elected consul for the first time in 182, with Gnaeus Baebius Tamphilus as junior partner. His next military command, with proconsular imperium, was in 181, against the Ingauni of Liguria.

== Later career ==
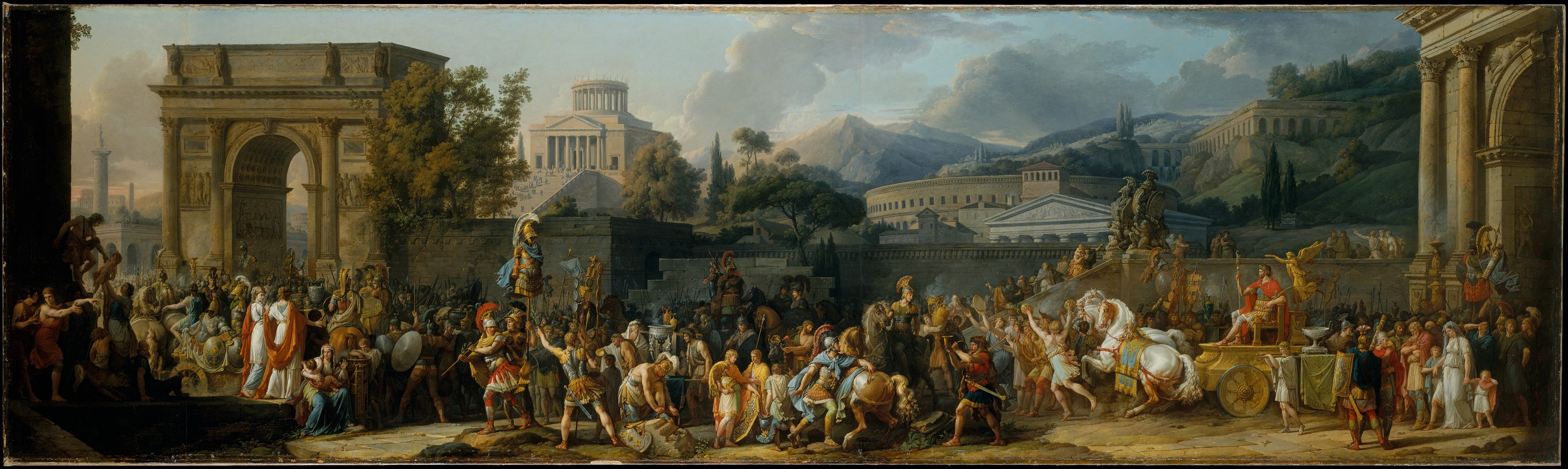
The Triumph of Aemilius Paullus by Vernet, ca. 1789.

The Third Macedonian War broke out in 171, when King Perseus of Macedon defeated a Roman army led by the consul Publius Licinius Crassus in the Battle of Callinicus. After two years of indecisive results for either side, Paullus was elected consul again in 168 (with Gaius Licinius Crassus as his colleague). As consul, he was appointed by the Roman Senate to deal with the Macedonian war. Shortly afterward, on 22 June, he won the decisive Battle of Pydna. Perseus of Macedonia was made prisoner and the Third Macedonian War ended.

In 167, Paullus received the Senate's instruction to return to Rome after first pillaging Epirus, a kingdom suspected of sympathizing with the Macedonian cause. After loading the treasures in the Macedonian royal palace onto Rome-bound ships, he marched his army to Epirus, where contrary to his inclination, he ordered the plunder of seventy towns, resulting in the enslavement of 150,000 people.

Paullus' return to Rome was glorious. With the immense plunder collected in Macedonia and Epirus, he celebrated a spectacular triumph, featuring no less than the captured king of Macedonia himself, and the king's sons, putting an end to the Antigonid dynasty. As a gesture of acknowledgement, the Senate awarded him the nickname (agnomen) Macedonicus. This was the peak of his career. In 164 he was elected censor. He fell ill, appeared to recover, but relapsed within three days and died during his term of office in 160.

== Family life and descendants ==
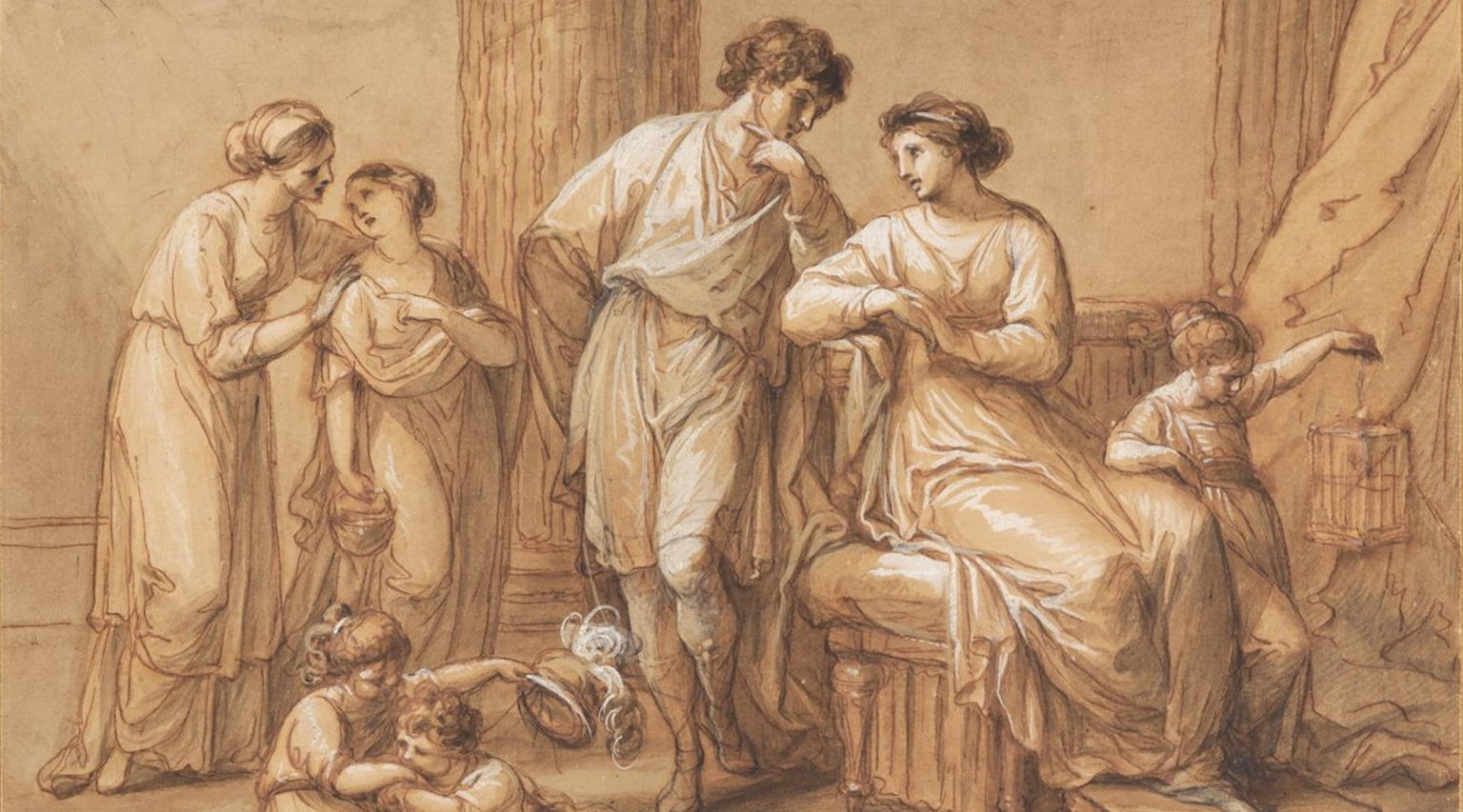
Angelica Kauffmann, Aemilius Paullus and his family, by 1783.

Paullus's father Lucius Aemilius Paullus died in the Battle of Cannae in 216 BC, when Paullus was still a boy. The Aemilii Paulli were connected by marriage and political interests to the Scipios, but their role in his subsequent upbringing is not clear.

Paullus had been married first to Papiria Masonis (or Papiria Masonia), daughter of the consul Gaius Papirius Maso (consul in 231 BC), whom he divorced, according to Plutarch, for no particular reason. From this marriage, four children were born: two sons and two daughters. He divorced his wife while his younger son was still a baby, according to Roman historians; thus the divorce probably took place around 183–182 BC. Nevertheless, he was elected consul in 182.

Paullus then married a second time (this wife's name is unknown) and had two more sons, the elder born around 181 and the younger born around 176, and another daughter, Aemilia Tertia, who was a small girl when he was chosen consul for the second time. She married Marcus Porcius Cato Licinianus, son of Cato the Elder.

Since four boys were too many for a father to support through the cursus honorum, Paullus decided to give the oldest two boys up for adoption, probably between 175 and 170. The elder boy was adopted in the Fabia family and became Quintus Fabius Maximus Aemilianus, thus joining his fortunes to the house of Quintus Fabius Maximus Verrucosus, a national hero. The younger boy, possibly named Lucius, was adopted by his own cousin, Publius Cornelius Scipio, elder son and heir of Scipio Africanus, and became Publius Cornelius Scipio Aemilianus, thus becoming heir to the legacy of Rome's most influential political dynasty.

With the eldest sons safely adopted by two of the most powerful patrician houses, Paullus counted on the two younger ones to continue his own name. Both of them died young, one shortly after the other, at the same time that Paullus celebrated his triumph in 167 BC. The elder of the two remaining sons was 14 and the younger 9, according to Polybius. Their names are unknown to us. The successes of his political and military career were thus not accompanied by a happy family life.

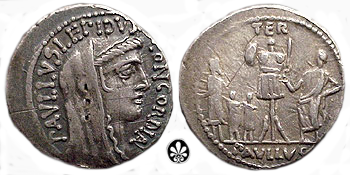
Togate figure of Lucius Aemilius Paullus standing left, touching trophy; to left standing right as captives, the King Perseus of Macedon and his two sons. Produced by descendant Lucius Aemilius Paullus c.52 BC.

At Paullus' death, his sons Quintus Fabius Maximus Aemilianus and Publius Cornelius Scipio Africanus Aemilianus received his property by his will, even though they were legally no longer Aemilii Paulli; Scipio gave his share to his older brother who was less wealthy. Paullus's second wife (whose name is unknown to us) received her dowry back from the sale of some of her late husband's property (Livy and Polybius both claim that Paullus died relatively poor, and that he had kept little for himself from the successful Macedonian campaign).

With the death of Paullus, the Aemilii Paulli became extinct, even though he had two living sons. His elder surviving son Fabius Aemilianus eventually became consul and fathered at least one son, who in turn became consul as Fabius Allobrigicus in 121. This man, in turn, may have been the ancestor of later Fabii who tied their fortunes to Julius Caesar and Augustus. The younger surviving son was more famous as Scipio Aemilianus but died leaving no known issue.

Paullus' first and former wife Papiria Masonia survived her ex-husband and lived to enjoy her former sister-in-law's property presented to her by her younger son (per Polybius). At her death, her property was divided between her sons, but Scipio gave it to his sisters.

Of Paullus' daughters, one of the eldest two married Quintus Aelius Tubero from a relatively poor plebeian family; she was the mother of Quintus Aelius Tubero. The youngest, Aemilia Paulla Tertia, married the eldest son of Marcus Porcius Cato and was the mother of consuls Marcus Porcius Cato and Gaius Porcius Cato.

== See also ==
- Aemilia gens
- Scipio-Paullus-Gracchus family tree
- Monument of Aemilius Paullus

== Sources ==
- Livy, History of Rome XLIV, 17 – XLVI, 41.
- Plutarch, Aemilius Paulus.
- Polybius, Histories, XXXII, 8.

Political offices
Preceded by Marcus Claudius Marcellus; Quintus Fabius Labeo	Roman consul 182 BC; With: Gnaeus Baebius Tamphilus	Succeeded by Publius Cornelius Cethegus; Marcus Baebius Tamphilus
Preceded by Quintus Marcius Philippus; Gnaeus Servilius Caepio	Roman consul II; 168 BC; With: Gaius Licinius Crassus	Succeeded by Quintus Aelius Paetus; Marcus Junius Pennus
Preceded by Gaius Claudius Pulcher; Tiberius Sempronius Gracchus	Roman censor 164–163 BC; With: Quintus Marcius Philippus	Succeeded by Publius Cornelius Scipio Nasica; Marcus Popillius Laenas
