= Gonnoi =

Gonnoi Γόννοι
- Municipal unit
- Location within the regional unit

- Location within Greece
- Coordinates: 39°52′N 22°28′E
- Country: Greece
- Administrative region: Thessaly
- Regional unit: Larissa
- Municipality: Tempi
- Districts: 3

Area
  - Municipal unit: 113.333 km^{2} (43.758 sq mi)
- Elevation: 94 m (308 ft)

Population (2021)
  - Municipal unit: 2,110
  - Municipal unit density: 18.6/km^{2} (48.2/sq mi)
  - Community: 1,727
- Time zone: UTC+2 (EET)
  - Summer (DST): UTC+3 (EEST)
- Postal code: 400 04
- Area code: 24950
- Vehicle registration: ΡΙ (Rho Iota)

Gonnoi (Greek: Γόννοι, before 1927: Δερελί - Dereli) is a former municipality in the Larissa regional unit, Thessaly, Greece. Since the 2011 local government reform it is part of the municipality Tempi, of which it is a municipal unit. The municipal unit has an area of 113.333 km^{2}. The municipality was created under the Kapodistrias Law in 1997 out of the former communes of Gonnoi, Kallipefki, Itea and Elaia. About 2 kilometres (1.2 mi) southeast of the town lies the site of the ancient city of Gonnus, after which the present town is named.

== Subdivisions ==
The municipal unit Gonnoi is subdivided into the following communities (constituent villages in brackets):

- Gonnoi (Gonnoi, Elaia)
- Itea
- Kallipefki

== Population ==
Year	Settlement population	Community population	Municipal unit population
1981	2,660	-	-
1991	2,443	-	3,622
2001	2,190	2,288	3,119
2011	1,909	1,983	2,462
2021	1,682	1,727	2,110

== History ==
The ancient city of Gonnoi was situated in a hillside near the contemporary Gonnoi, now called "Kastri" (i.e. castle). The area was consecutively ruled by the Kingdom of Macedonia, the Roman, the Byzantine and the Ottoman Empires. With most of Thessaly, Gonnoi became a part of Greece in 1881.

== See also ==
- List of settlements in the Larissa regional unit
