= Argissa Magoula =

Archaeological site in Greece

Argissa Magoula is a Neolithic settlement mound (tell) in Thessaly in Greece. It was excavated by Vladimir Milojčić from the University of Heidelberg in the 1950s. He claimed to have found evidence of an aceramic Neolithic, but this has been disputed.

== Sources ==
- Eva Hanschmann and Vladimir Milojčić, Die deutschen Ausgrabungen auf der Argissa-Magula in Thessalien. III, Die frühe und beginnende mittlere Bronzezeit. Bonn: Habelt, 1976.
- Hanschmann, Eva, Die deutschen Ausgrabungen auf der Argissa-Magula in Thessalien. IV, Die mittlere Bronzezeit. Bonn: Habelt, 1981. Beiträge zur ur- und frühgeschichtlichen Archäologie des Mittelmeer-Kulturraumes 23–24.
