= Pelasgiotis =

Elongated district of ancient Thessaly

Pelasgiotis in the centre of Thessaly

Pelasgiotis (Ancient Greek: Πελασγιῶτις, romanized: Pelasgiōtis) was an elongated district of ancient Thessaly, extending from the Vale of Tempe in the north to the city of Pherae in the south. The Pelasgiotis included the following localities: Argos Pelasgikon, Argyra, Armenium, Atrax, Crannon, Cynoscephalae, Elateia, Gyrton, Mopsion, Larissa, Kondaia, Onchestos river and town, Phayttos, Pherae, Scotussa, and Sykourion. The demonym of the district's inhabitants is Pelasgiotae or Pelasgiotes (Πελασγιῶται, Pelasgiōtai).

Along with Achaea Phthiotis, Thessaliotis and Histiaeotis, the Pelasgiotis comprised the Thessalian tetrarchy, governed by a tagus, when occasion required.

The territory is mentioned by Strabo but not by Herodotus, who seems to include it in the district of Thessaliotis.

In epigraphy, Pelasgiotes are mentioned among other Thessalian ambassadors in Athens c. 353 BC. A fragment of a marble stele at Larissa records that on request of the Roman consul Quintus Caecilius Metellus, son of Quintus, "friend and benefactor of our country [ethnei hēmōn]" in return for services rendered by him, his family and the Roman Senate and People, the Thessalian League decreed to send 43,000 coffers of wheat to Rome, to be taxed from different regions under the league. The Pelasgiotes and the Phthiotes are to provide 32,000 while the Histiaeotes and Thessaliotes must provide the remaining 11,000, with 25% going to the army, all in different months.

The regional and ethnic toponym is a reminiscent Pelasgian element from the Thessalian past. As in other parts of Thessaly, Aeolic Greek inscriptions are attested and after 2nd century BC, Koine Greek.

During the Thessalian Games at Larissa to Zeus Eleuthereus in the 1st century BC, several winner athletes are described as "Thessalian from Larissa of Pelasgis" (Θεσσαλὸς ἀπὸ Λαρίσης τῆς Πελασγίδος, Thessalos apo Larisēs tēs Pelasgidos). The 3rd-century BC funerary epigram for Erilaos of Kalchedon mentions also Λάρισα τᾶι Πελασγίδι, Larisa tai Pelasgidi.

== See also ==
- Pelasgia
- Pelasgus of Thessaly
