= Gonnus =

Ancient town and polis in Perrhaebi, Thessaly

Coordinates: 39°51′14″N 22°29′39″E

Map showing ancient Thessaly. Gonnus is shown in the upper centre along the Tempe.

Gonnus or Gonnos (Ancient Greek: Γόννος) or Gonni (Γόννοι) was a town and polis (city-state) of the Perrhaebi in ancient Thessaly, which derived its name, according to the later Greek critics, from Gonneus, mentioned in the Iliad. Its position made it one of the most important places in the north of Thessaly. It stood on the northern side of the Peneius, near the entrance of the only two passes by which an enemy can penetrate into Thessaly from the north. The celebrated vale of Tempe begins to narrow at Gonnus; and the pass across Mount Olympus a little to the west of Tempe leads into Thessaly at Gonnus. It was by the latter route that the army of Xerxes I entered Thessaly.

The position of Gonnus with respect to Tempe is clearly shown by the numerous passages in which it is mentioned by Livy. After the Battle of Cynoscephalae (197 BCE), Philip V of Macedon fled in haste to Tempe, but halted a day at Gonnus, to receive such of his troops as might have survived the battle. In the war against Antiochus III, in 191 BCE, when the king, having marched from Demetrias, had advanced as far north as Larissa, a portion of the Roman army under the command of Appius Claudius marched through the pass across Mount Olympus, and thus arrived at Gonnus. On this occasion Livy says that Gonnus was 20 miles (32 km) from Larissa, and describes it as situated "in ipsis faucibus saltus quæ Tempe appellantur." In 171 BCE it was strongly fortified by Perseus of Macedon; and when this monarch retired into Macedonia, the Roman consul Licinius advanced against the town, but found it impregnable. Gonnus does not occur in history after the wars of the Romans in Greece, but it is mentioned by Strabo and Ptolemy.

The editors of the Barrington Atlas of the Greek and Roman World locate Gonnus at the modern town of Gonnoi. A site, called Gonoussa (Γονούσσα), about 2 kilometres (1.2 mi) southeast of the modern town has been excavated extensively.
