= Cephisodorus =

Name list

Cephisodorus, Caphisodorus or Kephisodoros (Ancient Greek: Κηφισόδωρος; English translation: "gift of the Cephisus") was a male Greek name.

1. Cephisodorus, an Athenian dramatist of the Old Comedy. According to Lysias, he was a comic poet who won a victory in 402 BC. This victory was probably in the Lenaea; around the same time Cephisodorus appears on the surviving victory lists for the City Dionysia. The Suda says that he was a tragedian, and credits him with four plays: Antilais, Amazons, Trophonius, and The Hog. The titles quoted by the Suda are comic, and so the identification of Cephisodorus as a tragedian is likely to be an error.

2. Cephisodorus, a Theban rebel and exile who accompanied Pelopidas to the house of the pro-Spartan polemarch Leontidas to kill him during the recapture of Cadmea from Spartan forces, but, being the first to encounter him, was killed by him, but Leontidas was subsequently killed by Pelopidas.

3. Cephisodorus, a military commander who fought and died with Gryllus, son of Xenophon in the Battle of Mantineia in 362 BC.

4. Caphisodorus, Theban soldier and lover of General Epaminondas, both killed at the Battle of Mantinea and buried together.

5. Kephisodoros, an Athenian leader who opposed Philip V during the Second Makedonian War. After allying Athens to fellow Greek powers including Attalus I of Pergamon, Ptolemy V of Egypt, the Aetolian League, Crete, and Rhodes, he travelled to Rome to request the Senate for further aid against Makedon. The Romans sent Publius Sulpicius Galba Maximus, Publius Villius Tappulus (who Pausanias calls Otilios), and Titus Quinctius Flamininus who defeated Philip V at the Battle of Cynoscephalae.
