= Battle of Mantinea =

Battle of Mantinea may refer to one of several battles fought near Mantineia (Mantinea) in Ancient Greece:

- Battle of Mantinea (418 BC), victory of Sparta against an alliance of Argos and Athens
- Siege of Mantinea (385 BC), victory of Sparta
- Battle of Mantinea (362 BC), victory of Thebes against Sparta, although its general Epaminondas died
- Battle of Mantinea (207 BC), victory of the Achaean League against the Spartan tyrant Machanidas
