= Anticrates (Spartan) =

4th-century BC Spartan soldier

Anticrates (Ancient Greek: Ἀντικράτης) was a Spartan who, "according to Dioscorides," killed Epaminondas at the Battle of Mantineia in 362 BCE. The descendants of Anticrates are said to have been called Machairiones (Μαχαιρίωνες) by the Spartans, on account of his having struck Epaminondas with a machaira (that is a sword or large knife, μαχαίρα), but Pausanias mentions a man named "Machaerion", a Spartan or Mantineian, who was said to have struck the killing blow. Others attribute it to Gryllus, son of Xenophon.
