= Delos (disambiguation) =

Delos is one of the most important mythological, historical and archaeological sites in Greece.

Delos may also refer to:

== People with the name ==
- Delos R. Ashley (1828–1873), American politician
- Delos W. Baxter (1857–1918), American politician
- Delos Davis (1846–1915), Canadian lawyer
- Shaquil Delos (born 1999), French footballer
- Delos Drake (1886–1965), American baseball player
- Delos Carleton Emmons (1888–1965), United States Army general
- Delos W. Lovelace (1894–1967), American novelist
- Lawrence Delos Miles (1904–1985), American engineer
- Delos Bennett Sackett (1822–1885), United States Army general
- Robert Delos Santos (1928-2020), French diplomat and military personnel
- Delos H. Smith (1884–1963), American architect
- Delos Thurber (1916–1987), American athlete

== Arts, entertainment, and media ==
- Delos D. Harriman, a fictional character from the works of Robert Heinlein
- Delos (park), a fictional amusement park in the 1973 film Westworld
- Delos International, an independent record label
- Delos Productions, an American classical record label specializing in Russian music
- Sailing SV Delos, a YouTube channel

== Other uses ==
- Delos (gastropod), a genus of medium-sized predatory air-breathing land snails
- Delos (mountain), a mountain located in Boeotia, Greece
- Delos or delos, a Philippine linguistic corruption of the Spanish nobiliary particle or prepositional particle "de los" [The same corruption occurs in the use of "de la" and "de las" as well as "de" (thus pandesal) in the country]

== See also ==
- Delo (disambiguation)
