= Oblique order =

Military tactic

The oblique order (also known as the 'declined flank') is a military tactic whereby an attacking army focuses its forces to attack a single enemy flank. The force commander concentrates the majority of his strength on one flank and uses the remainder to fix the enemy line. This allows a commander with weaker or equal forces to achieve a local superiority in numbers. The commander can then try to defeat the enemy in detail. It has been used by numerous successful generals. Oblique order requires disciplined troops able to execute complex maneuvers in varied circumstances.

== Detail ==
In the oblique order attack, the commander of the army would intentionally weaken one portion of the line to concentrate their troops elsewhere. They would then create an angled or oblique formation, refuse the weakened flank and attack the strongest flank of the enemy with a concentration of force. Once the critical flank was secure, the commander would wheel the troops 90 degrees to roll up the enemy line, and the angled formation would continue to advance. The echelons not involved in the assault served the important function of holding the rival army in check by remaining defensive and threatening, thus offering protection to the attacking echelons by keeping the enemy force occupied. On occasion both commanders would attempt the same tactic (e.g.the Diadochi trying to replicate Alexander's tactics). The oblique order was a tactic particularly favored by King Frederick II of Prussia.

=== Requirements and disadvantages ===
Proper execution of Frederick's oblique order involved three main requirements. First, each officer needed to know exactly how to form a battalion from "line to column, maintain its place in the column, and then redeploy either normally, or en echelon for the final attack." The next two necessities were that the soldiers marched in close formation, and in step. Cadenced marching had not been used since the days of the Roman Empire; however, uncadenced marching, or 'route step', required loose marching order to ensure that the soldiers did not bump into each other, and the oblique order could not have been implemented in such unstructured formations. Lastly, for the oblique order to be successful the leaders of the opposing forces had to be unaware of the Frederician technique, which could be countered by a quick response from them; the attack required a confused enemy army incapable of a rapid change in their deployment. Frederick's oblique order was born of the desire to overwhelm a weak point in the enemy line, thus allowing a smaller Prussian force superiority on the battlefield.

There were some dangers with attempting an oblique order in battle, namely the chance of opening up a fatal gap between the two wings, or that the two forces may completely lose contact. Moreover, the Frederician oblique order called for a long march, either through the night, or in the early hours of the morning of the assault, which meant that the advancing Prussian forces were almost always fatigued by the time they engaged their enemy. Another risky aspect of the oblique order was that it required total determination, as, once it was executed, the assaulting echelons would be deployed with no chance of being recalled.

== History ==
=== Antiquity ===
The first recorded use of a tactic similar to the oblique order was in 371 BC at the Battle of Leuctra, when the Thebans under Epaminondas defeated the Spartans by reinforcing their left flank to fifty rows deep, rather than spreading their troops evenly across the front. This move might have had its origin in the previous Battle of Tegyra, where the Thebans under Pelopidas, a political ally to Epaminondas, placed their best troops in close array on the left flank. Philip of Macedon learned Epaminondas' technique while held prisoner at Thebes, and his successors, including Alexander the Great, used it in their campaigns.

Asclepiodotus mentions the so called oblique phalanx (Ancient Greek: λοξὴ φάλαγξ loxē phalanx) in his Tactica. Vegetius is known to have written about the tactic that became the oblique order of battle.

=== Medieval ===
A variation of the formation known as the hammer and anvil was used with devastating effect by Khalid ibn al-Walid in the Battle of Yarmouk AD 636. He massed all his cavalry behind his right flank, and led a combined cavalry-infantry assault on the Byzantine left, while simultaneously ordering his centre and left to make minor holding attacks to tie down the enemy center and right. Thus the Byzantine left was completely destroyed and with Byzantine cavalry driven off the battlefield, the center was enveloped, leading to a resounding Arab victory.

=== Early modern era ===
Subsequent military commanders in the early modern world again employed such tactics once they rediscovered the writings of antiquity. In the Battle of Pavia, Imperial commander in chief Fernando d'Avalos advanced in oblique order. In the Battle of Breitenfeld, fellow Imperial general Johann Tserclaes von Tilly also made an oblique advance against the Swedish and Saxon forces of Gustavus Adolphus and was repulsed only due to the Swedes' superior combined arms tactics. Simon Goodenough wrote of Tilly's manoeuvre: "It was a manoeuvre worthy of Alexander the Great and Epaminondas and one that was to be repeated with startling success by Frederick the Great." Yet another imperial general, Raimondo Montecuccoli, who maintained that the best forces should always be positioned on the flanks with the more powerful wing initiating the attack, was the first of the more modern generals to employ tactics similar to the oblique order of battle, and Frederick II of Prussia was well aware of the texts of Montecuccoli.

The Battle of Rossbach in 1757 shows the oblique order at its worst and at its best. The large marginally trained and poorly disciplined Allied army attempted an ill-conceived and badly executed oblique attack on the Prussian left. The far smaller but highly trained and superbly disciplined Prussian army countered with a well-conceived and perfectly executed oblique attack of their own on the advancing Allied right. The apparent Prussian retreat goaded the Allies on, further disorganizing their dense columns already in disarray from the march. Using intense musket and cannon fire from the front and a charge from hidden cavalry in the flank and rear, the Prussians quickly destroyed the Allied right and routed their Army.

Prussian generals under Frederick the Great used the tactic in their own manner. The Prussian attacking army sent a strong advance force of infantry directly towards the enemy. The frontline troops occupied the attention of the enemy and the rest of the troops would maneuver behind it. They could also exploit any locally available obstacle, using hindering terrain or the smoke of cannon and musket fire to mask maneuvers. The Prussian cavalry would be stationed so as to cover the flank of the main body. Frederick even instructed his senior officers that numerical inferiority was indeed an advantage when it came to implementing 'his oblique order', as they could merely weaken one wing while reinforcing the other.

The main body of the army would then spread their forces to one side and deploy in an echelon (or the "oblique order"), spreading their firepower and attacking the stronger enemy flank with increasing pressure. The protective cavalry would then exploit any enemy collapse. Frederick first implemented his oblique order at the Battle of Hohenfriedberg, in 1745, with a subsequent major victory, despite numerical inferiority, at the Battle of Leuthen in 1757. It was in this decade, between the Silesian Wars and the Seven Years' War, that Frederick had his army perfect all the manoeuvres of the oblique order of battle.

The theoretical seeds of Frederick's oblique order can be seen in two of the Seelowitz Instructions' ('Instruction für die Cavalleire', 17 March, Oeuvres, XXX, 33; 'Disposition für die sämmtlichen Regimenter Infanterie', 25 March Oeuvres, XXX, 75) in March 1742. Members of the German General Staff maintained that Frederick was only dedicated to the oblique order after the Second Silesian War, with full-hearted application of the tactic in the Seven Years' War; however, Otto Herrman disputed the Staff Historians' insubstantial definitions of oblique order and claimed that Frederick had sought to utilize oblique at Mollwitz and Chotusitz. The most likely and poignant arguments for the advent of Fredrician oblique order came from Rudolf Keibel, who held that Frederick had indeed been implementing it since Hohenfriedberg.

Since the Austrians had been taught valuable lessons in the wars for Silesia, Frederician tactics were, as Frederick knew from his informants, a subject of discussion in the Viennese cabinet, where Francis I, Holy Roman Emperor, remarked that 'Old Fritz' preferred a one-winged-attack style of warfare that burdened his troops heavily. Then, in 1760, official documents obtained in the capture of Major-General Gzettritz offered direct insight into Frederick's oblique tactics, meaning that Frederick could henceforth be engaged with a well-informed army capable of countering his tactics. Furthermore, the Prussian forces, being heavily fatigued by the time they reached their target, lacked the ability to repel a well-situated enemy, such as at Kunersdorf, or an enemy that made a sudden about-turn, such as at the Battle of Zorndorf or the Battle of Torgau.

The oblique order tactic was used by the Second Coalition to confront the French at the Battle of the Trebbia (1799).
