= Epaminondas =

Theban general and statesman (419/411–362 BC)

- Ἐπαμεινώνδας
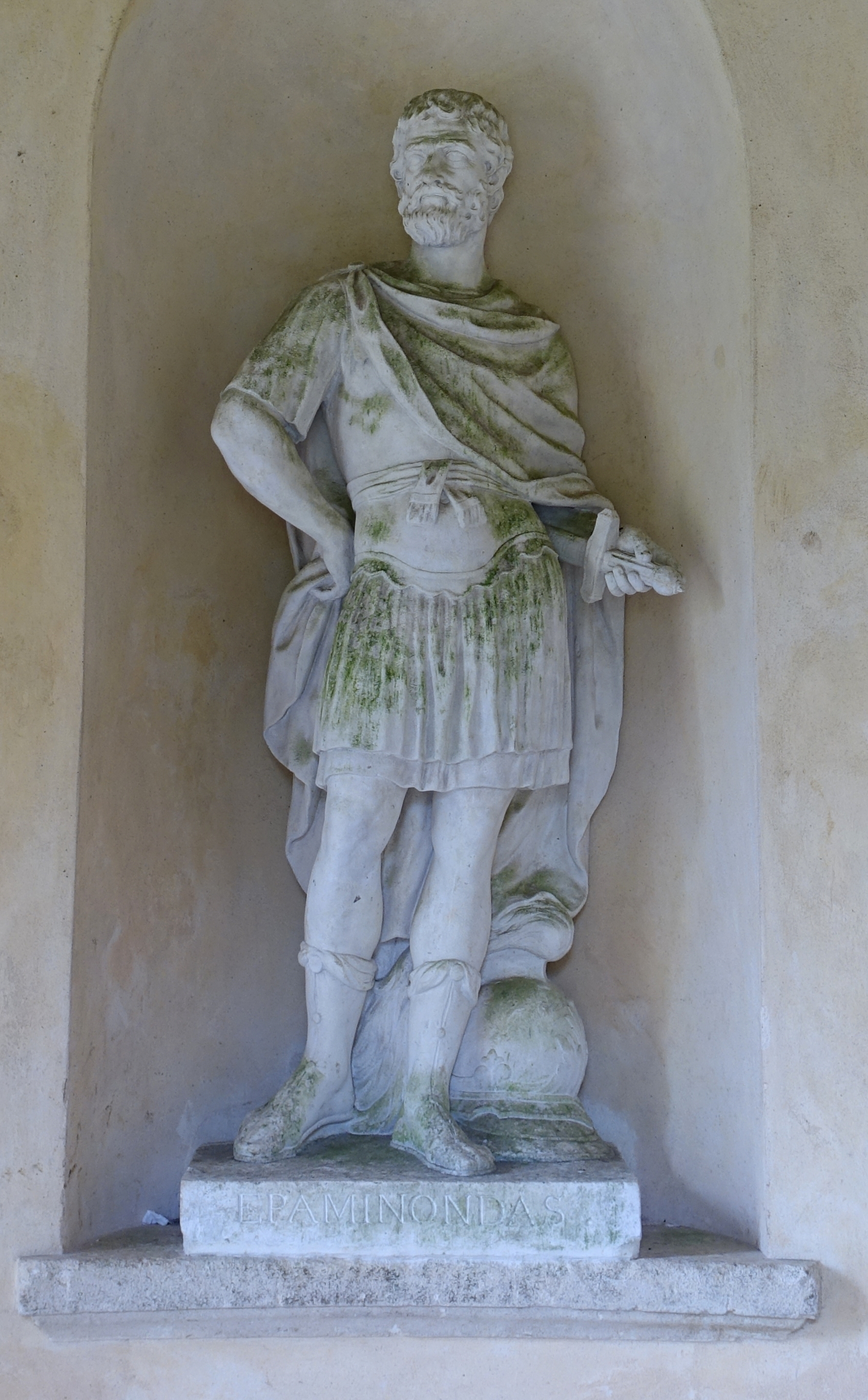
- Epaminondas, depicted as an idealized figure on the grounds of Stowe House
- Born: 419 or 411 BC
- Died: 4 July 362 BC (age about 53); Near Mantineia, Peloponnese
- Military career
- Allegiance: 385 BC: Thebes
- Service years: 385 and 371–362 BC
- Rank: Boeotarch
- Conflicts: Siege of Mantinea; Battle of Leuctra; Battle of Mantinea (362 BC)

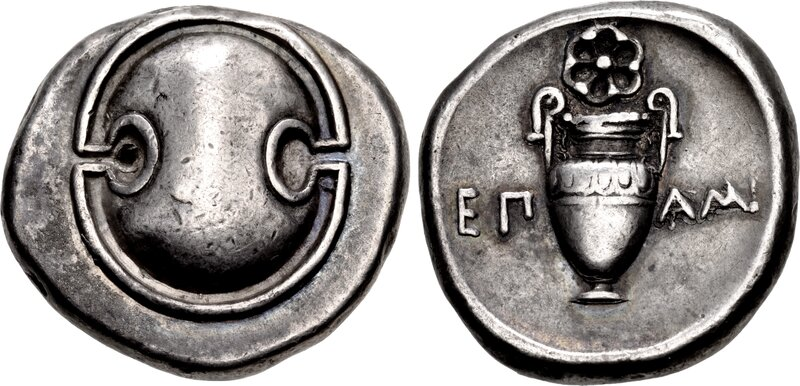
Stater of the Boeotian League minted c. 364–362 BC by Epaminondas, whose name EΠ-AMI is inscribed on the reverse

Epaminondas (/ɪˌpæmaɪˈnɒndəs/; Ancient Greek: Ἐπαμεινώνδας, romanized: Epameinōndas; 419/411–362 BC) was a Greek general and statesman of the 4th century BC who transformed the Ancient Greek city-state of Thebes, leading it out of Spartan subjugation into a pre-eminent position in Greek politics called the Theban Hegemony. In the process, he broke Spartan military power with his victory at Leuctra and liberated the Messenian helots, a group of Peloponnesian Greeks who had been enslaved under Spartan rule for some 230 years following their defeat in the Second Messenian War ending in 600 BC. Epaminondas reshaped the political map of Greece, fragmented old alliances, created new ones, and supervised the construction of entire cities. He was also militarily influential and invented and implemented several important battlefield tactics, such as the oblique order.

Xenophon, the historian and contemporary, is the main source for Epaminondas's military prowess, and Xenophon describes his admiration for him in his major work Hellenica (book VII, chap. 5, 19). Accordingly, in later centuries the Roman orator Cicero called him "the first man of Greece", and in more recent times Michel de Montaigne judged him one of the three "worthiest and most excellent men" who had ever lived. The changes Epaminondas wrought on the Greek political order did not long outlive him, as the cycle of shifting hegemonies and alliances continued unabated. A mere twenty-seven years after his death, a recalcitrant Thebes was obliterated by Alexander the Great. Thus Epaminondas—who had been praised in his time as an idealist and liberator—is today largely remembered for a decade (371 BC to 362 BC) of campaigning that established a decade long Theban hegemony but also sapped the strength of the great city-states and paved the way for Macedonian hegemony.

== Historical sources ==
The life of Epaminondas is very poorly attested in the ancient sources, especially compared to some of his near contemporaries (e.g. Philip II of Macedon and Pelopidas). One principal reason for this is the loss of Plutarch's biography of him. Epaminondas was one of approximately 50 ancient figures given an extensive biography by Plutarch in his Parallel Lives, in which he is paired with the Roman statesman Scipio Africanus; however, both of these parts of Lives are now lost. Plutarch wrote his biography over 400 years after Epaminondas's death and is therefore very much a secondary source, but he often explicitly names his sources, which allows some degree of verification of his statements.

Some episodes of Epaminondas's life can be found in Plutarch's Lives of Pelopidas and Agesilaus II, who were contemporaries. There is also a surviving (and possibly abridged) biography of Epaminondas by the Roman author Cornelius Nepos from the first century BC which, in the absence of Plutarch's, becomes a major source for Epaminondas's life.

The period of Greek history from 411–362 BC is primarily attested by the historian, contemporary and direct witness Xenophon, his work being a continuation of Thucydides's History of the Peloponnesian War. Xenophon, who was partial to Sparta and its king, Agesilaus, does not always mention Epaminondas himself and does not note his presence at the Battle of Leuctra. However, Xenophon tells us of Epaminondas's last battle and death, which is told in the last and seventh book of the Hellenica.

Epaminondas's role in the conflicts of the 4th century is also described, much later, by Diodorus Siculus, in his Bibliotheca historica. Diodorus was writing in the 1st century BC, and is also very much a secondary source, though useful for corroborating details found elsewhere.

== Early life ==
Epaminondas was born at Thebes to a family of high standing which, according to tradition, claimed descent from the mythical Spartoi. His year of birth cannot be determined with precision, and estimates have varied between 419 and 411 BC. What has been recorded of Epaminondas's immediate family is that his father was called Polymnis, he had a brother named Caphisias, and both parents lived to see his victory at the Battle of Leuctra in 371 BC. His education was regarded as excellent and comprehensive. He learned how to handle a cither, to play the flute, and to dance, and, while exercising in the gymnasium (traditionally a cornerstone of Theban education), he demonstrated a preference for agility over sheer strength. Epaminondas was taught philosophy by Lysis of Tarentum, a Pythagorean who had escaped persecution in Magna Graecia and was allowed to settle in Epaminondas's father's own house.

Lysis had a significant influence on Epaminondas, who grew devoted to his aged teacher, embraced his Pythagorean philosophy, and later reportedly took special care of his grave. Epaminondas was said to have displayed all the desirable virtues of the age, including patriotism, incorruptibility, selflessness, and modesty. In order to limit his needs and increase his independence, he led a frugal lifestyle and even seems to have lived in voluntary poverty. The ancient sources also draw attention to his skill in military matters and eloquence, as well as his taciturn demeanor, steadfast wit, and aptitude for crude humor. Epaminondas never married, which he compensated, in Pythagorean manner, by assiduously cultivating friendships, most famously with his lifelong companion Pelopidas.

== Political and military career ==
=== Background ===
Epaminondas lived at a particularly turbulent point in Greek history. Following its victory in the Peloponnesian War in 404 BC, Sparta had embarked upon an aggressively unilateralist policy towards the rest of Greece and quickly alienated many of its former allies. Thebes, meanwhile, had greatly increased its own power during the war and sought to gain control of the other cities of Boeotia (the region of ancient Greece northwest of Attica). This policy, along with other disputes, brought Thebes into conflict with Sparta. By 395 BC, Thebes, alongside Athens, Corinth, and Argos, found itself arrayed against Sparta (a former ally) in the Corinthian War. That war, which dragged on inconclusively for eight years, saw several bloody Theban defeats at Spartan hands. By the time of its conclusion, Thebes had been forced to check its expansionist ambitions and return to its old alliance with Sparta.

In 382 BC, however, the Spartan commander Phoebidas committed an act that would ultimately turn Thebes against Sparta for good and pave the way for Epaminondas's rise to power. Passing through Boeotia on campaign, Phoebidas took advantage of civil strife within Thebes to secure entrance to the city for his troops. Once inside, he seized the Cadmeia (the Theban acropolis), and forced the anti-Spartan party to flee the city. Epaminondas, although associated with that faction, was allowed to remain; since "his philosophy made him to be looked down upon as a recluse, and his poverty as impotent". The Spartans installed a puppet government in Thebes, and garrisoned the Cadmeia to ensure the behaviour of the Thebans.

=== Early career ===
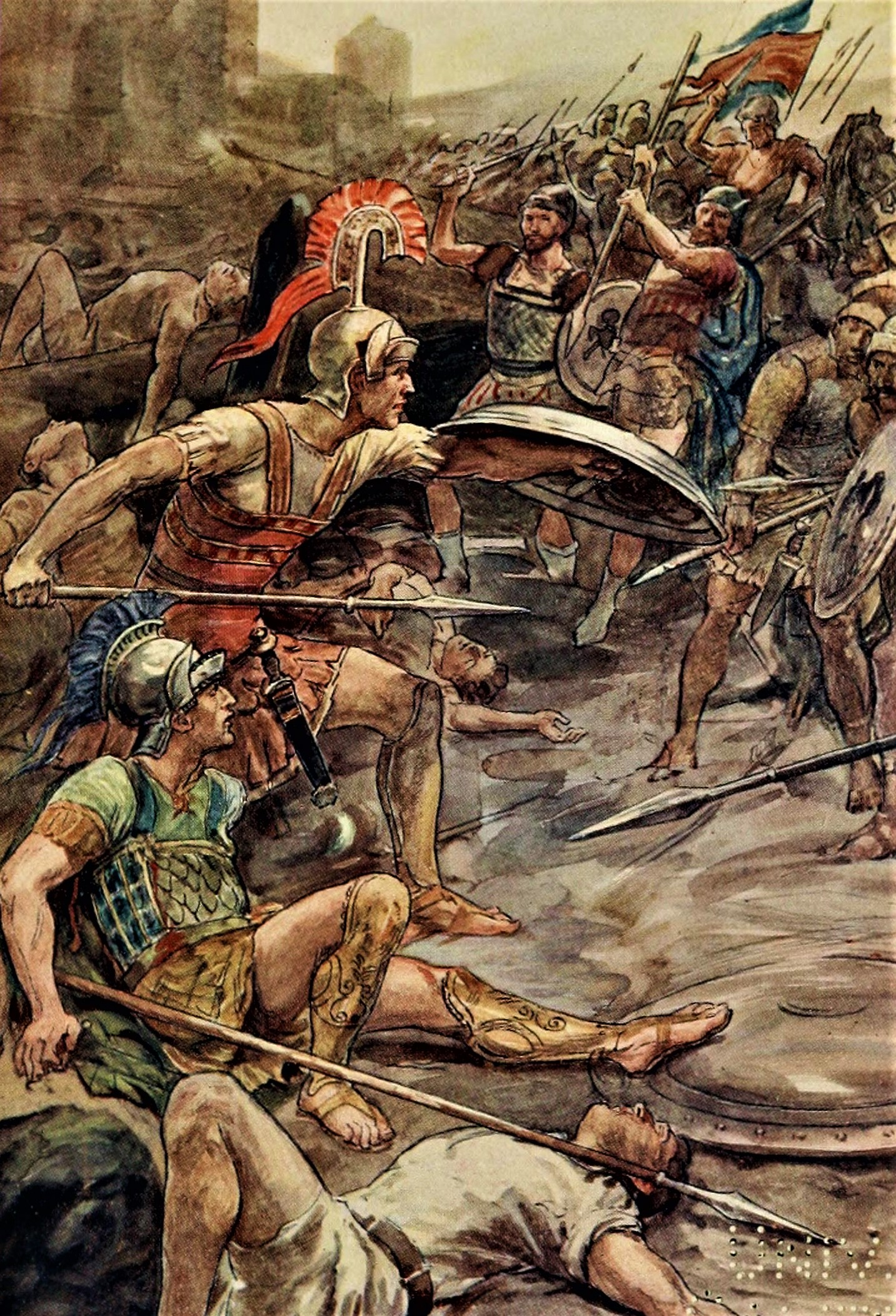
Epaminondas defending Pelopidas at the siege of Mantinea (385 BC), picture by William Rainey (1900).

Epaminondas supposedly served in a Theban contingent that aided Sparta in its attack against the city of Mantinea in 385 BC, during which he is said to have saved the life of Pelopidas, an act that cemented their friendship. The anecdote, reported by Plutarch and Pausanias, has been dismissed as an unhistorical doublet of Socrates's saving of Alcibiades at the Battle of Delium in 424 BC. While some historians at least accept that Epaminondas served with the Spartans in 385 BC, one author has questioned altogether the existence of a Spartan–Theban alliance during this period.

==== Theban coup of 378 BC ====
In the years following the Spartan takeover, the exiled Thebans regrouped in Athens and, at the instigation of Pelopidas, prepared to liberate their city. Meanwhile, in Thebes, Epaminondas began preparing the young men of the city to fight the Spartans. In the winter of 379 BC, a small group of the exiles, led by Pelopidas, infiltrated the city. They then assassinated the leaders of the pro-Spartan government, and supported by Epaminondas and Gorgidas, who led a group of young men, and a force of Athenian hoplites, they surrounded the Spartans on the Cadmeia. The following day, Epaminondas and Gorgidas brought Pelopidas and his men before the Theban assembly and exhorted the Thebans to fight for their freedom; the assembly responded by acclaiming Pelopidas and his men as liberators. The Cadmeia was surrounded, and the Spartans attacked; Pelopidas realised that they must be expelled before an army came from Sparta to relieve them. The Spartan garrison eventually surrendered on the condition that they were allowed to march away unharmed. The narrow margin of the conspirators' success is demonstrated by the fact that the Spartan garrison met a Spartan force on the way to rescue them as they marched back to Sparta.

==== Aftermath, 378–371 BC ====
When news of the uprising at Thebes reached Sparta, an army under Cleombrotus I had been dispatched to subdue the city, but turned back without engaging the Thebans. Another army under Agesilaus II was then dispatched to attack the Thebans. However, the Thebans refused to meet the Spartan army in battle, instead building a trench and stockade outside Thebes, which they occupied, preventing the Spartans advancing on the city. The Spartans ravaged the countryside but eventually departed, leaving Thebes independent. This victory so heartened the Thebans that they undertook operations against other neighboring cities as well. (Note: They attacked twice Thespiae) In short order the Thebans were able to reconstitute their old Boeotian confederacy in a new, democratic form. The cities of Boeotia united as a federation with an executive body composed of seven generals, or Boeotarchs, elected from seven districts throughout Boeotia. This political fusion was so successful that henceforth the names Theban and Boeotian were used interchangeably in a nod to the newfound solidarity of the region.

Seeking to crush the Thebans, the Spartans would invade Boeotia three times over the next few years (378 BC, 377 BC, ? possibly Leuctra). At first, the Thebans feared facing the Spartans head on, but the conflict gave them much practice and training, and they "had their spirits roused and their bodies thoroughly inured to hardships, and gained experience and courage from their constant struggles". Although Sparta remained the dominant land power in Greece, the Boeotians had demonstrated that they, too, were a martial threat and a politically cohesive power. At the same time, Pelopidas, an advocate of an aggressive policy against Sparta, had established himself as a major political leader in Thebes.

Epaminondas's role in the years prior to 371 BC is difficult to piece together. Certainly, he served with the Theban armies in the defence of Boeotia in the 370s BC, and by 371 BC, he had become a Boeotarch. It seems safe to assume, given their close friendship and their close collaboration after 371 BC, that Epaminondas and Pelopidas also collaborated closely on Theban policy in the period of 378–371 BC.

==== Peace conference of 371 BC ====
The years following the Theban coup had seen desultory fighting between Sparta and Thebes, with Athens also drawn into the conflict. A feeble attempt at a common peace had been made in 375 BC, but desultory fighting between Athens and Sparta had resumed by 373 BC (at the latest). By 371 BC, Athens and Sparta were again war-weary, and in 371 BC a conference was held at Sparta to discuss another attempt at a common peace.

Epaminondas was serving as a Boeotarch for 371 BC, and led the Boeotian delegation to the peace conference. Peace terms were agreed at the outset of the conference, and the Thebans presumably signed the treaty in their own name alone. However, on the following day, Epaminondas caused a drastic break with Sparta when he insisted on signing not for the Thebans alone, but for all the Boeotians. Agesilaus refused to allow the change of the Theban envoys' signature, insisting that the cities of Boeotia should be independent; Epaminondas countered that if this were to be the case, the cities of Laconia should be as well. Irate, Agesilaus struck the Thebans from the document. The delegation returned to Thebes, and both sides mobilized for war.

==== Battle of Leuctra (371 BC) ====
The Battle of Leuctra (371 BC), showing Epaminondas's tactical advances

Immediately following the failure of the peace talks, orders were sent out from Sparta to the Spartan king Cleombrotus, who was at the head of an army in Phocis, commanding him to march directly to Boeotia. Skirting north to avoid mountain passes where the Boeotians were prepared to ambush him, Cleombrotus entered Boeotian territory from an unexpected direction and quickly seized a fort and captured 10 or 12 triremes. Then marching towards Thebes, he camped at Leuctra, in the territory of Thespiae. Here, the Boeotian army came to meet him. The Spartan army contained some 10,000 hoplites, 700 of whom were the elite warriors known as Spartiates. The Boeotians opposite them numbered about 6,000, but were bolstered by a cavalry superior to that of the Peloponnesians.

Epaminondas was given charge of the Boeotian army, with the other six Boeotarchs in an advisory capacity. Pelopidas, meanwhile, was captain of the Sacred Band, the elite Theban troops. Before the battle, there was evidently much debate amongst the Boeotarchs about whether to fight or not. As a consistent advocate of an aggressive policy, Epaminondas wished to fight, and supported by Pelopidas, he managed to swing the vote in favour of battle. During the course of the battle, Epaminondas was to display a grasp of tactics hitherto unseen in Greek warfare.

The phalanx formation used by Greek armies had a distinct tendency to veer to the right during battle, "because fear makes each man do his best to shelter his unarmed side with the shield of the man next him on the right". Traditionally, a phalanx therefore lined up for battle with the elite troops on the right flank to counter this tendency. Thus, in the Spartan phalanx at Leuctra, Cleombrotus and the elite 'Spartiates' were on the right, while the less experienced Peloponnesian allies were on the left. However, needing to counter the Spartans' numerical advantage, Epaminondas implemented two tactical innovations. Firstly, he took the best troops in the army, and arranged them 50 ranks deep (as opposed to the normal 8–12 ranks) on the left wing, opposite Cleombrotus and the Spartans, with Pelopidas and the Sacred Band on the extreme left flank. Secondly, recognizing that he could not have matched the width of the Peloponnesian phalanx (even before deepening the left flank), he abandoned all attempts to do so. Instead, placing the weaker troops on the right flank, he "instructed them to avoid battle and withdraw gradually during the enemy's attack". The tactic of the deep phalanx had been anticipated by Pagondas, another Theban general, who used a 25 man deep formation at the Battle of Delium. However, the reversing of the position of the elite troops, and an oblique line of attack were innovations; it seems that Epaminondas was therefore responsible for the military tactic of refusing one's flank.

The fighting at Leuctra opened with a clash between the cavalry, in which the Thebans were victorious over the inferior Spartan cavalry, driving them back into the ranks of the infantry, and thereby disrupting the phalanx. The battle then commenced in earnest, with the strengthened Theban left flank advancing at double speed, while the right flank retreated. After intense fighting, the Spartan right flank began to give way under the impetus and the mass of Thebans, and Cleombrotus was killed. Although the Spartans held on for long enough to rescue the body of the king, their line was soon broken by the sheer force of the Theban assault. The Peloponnesian allies on the left wing, seeing the Spartans put to flight, also broke and ran, and the entire army retreated in disarray. One thousand Peloponnesians were killed, while the Boeotians lost only 300 men. Most importantly, since it constituted a significant proportion of the entire Spartan manpower, 400 of the 700 Spartiates present were killed, a loss that posed a serious threat to Sparta's future war-making abilities. When, after the battle, the Spartans asked if they and the Peloponnesians could collect the dead, Epaminondas suspected that the Spartans would try to cover-up the scale of their losses. He therefore allowed the Peloponnesians to remove their dead first, so that those remaining would be shown to be Spartiates, and emphasise the scale of the Theban victory.

The victory at Leuctra shook the foundations of the Spartan dominance of Greece to the core. Since the number of Spartiates was always relatively small, Sparta had relied on her allies in order to field substantial armies. However, with the defeat at Leuctra, the Peloponnesian allies were less inclined to bow to Spartan demands. Furthermore, with the loss of men at Leuctra and other battles, the Spartans were not in a strong position to reassert their dominance over their erstwhile allies.

=== Theban hegemony ===
In the immediate aftermath of Leuctra, the Thebans considered following up their victory by taking their vengeance on Sparta; they also invited Athens to join them in doing so. However, their Thessalian allies under Jason of Pherae dissuaded them from shattering what remained of the Spartan army. Instead, Epaminondas occupied himself with consolidating the Boeotian confederacy, compelling the previously Spartan-aligned polis of Orchomenus to join the league.

The following year the Thebans invaded the Peloponnesus, aiming to break Spartan power for good. It is not clear exactly when the Thebans started to think not just of ending the Spartan hegemony, but of replacing it with one of their own, but it is clear that eventually this became their aim. Hans Beck asserts that, unlike Sparta in the Peloponnesian League and Athens in the Delian League, Thebes made no effort either to create an empire or to bind its allies in any sort of permanent and stable organization. Indeed, after Leuctra, Thebes devoted its attention to diplomatic efforts in Central Greece rather than schemes of domination further afield. By late 370 Thebes' network of alliances in central Greece made her secure in the area—as she had not been before Leuctra—and offered scope for further expansion of Theban influence. (Note: A series of states formed alliances with Thebes: Aetolians, Acarnanians, Aenianians, West and East Locrians, Phocians, Heracleots, Malians, and Euboeans. The Euboeans defected from the Athenian Confederacy to join Thebes.)

==== First Invasion of the Peloponnese (370 BC) ====
When, in the immediate aftermath of Leuctra, the Thebans had sent a herald to Athens with news of their victory, the messenger was met with stony silence. The Athenians then decided to take advantage of the Spartan discomfiture, holding a conference in Athens, in which the peace terms proposed earlier in 371 BC were ratified by all cities (except Elis); and this time, the treaty explicitly made the Peloponnesian cities, formerly under Spartan dominance, independent. Taking advantage of this, the Mantineans decided to unify their settlements into a single city, and to fortify it; a decision which greatly angered Agesilaus. Furthermore, Tegea, supported by Mantinea, instigated the formation of an Arcadian alliance. This led to the Spartans declaring war on Mantinea, whereupon the majority of Arcadian cities grouped together to oppose the Spartans (thus forming the confederation that the Spartans were trying to prevent), and requested assistance from the Thebans. The Theban force arrived late in 370 BC, and it was led by Epaminondas and Pelopidas, both at this time Boeotarchs. As they journeyed into Arcadia, the Thebans were joined by armed contingents from many of Sparta's former allies, swelling their forces to some 50–70,000 men. In Arcadia Epaminondas encouraged the Arcadians to form their proposed league, and to build the new city of Megalopolis (as a center of power opposed to Sparta).

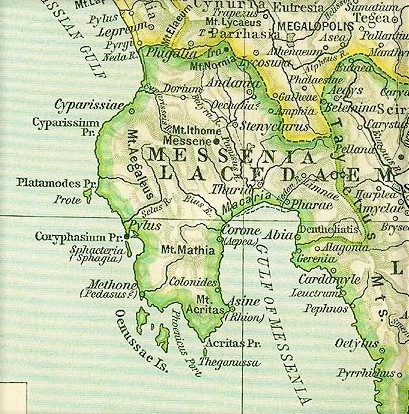
Messenia in the classical period

Epaminondas, supported by Pelopidas and the Arcadians, then persuaded the other Boeotarchs to invade Laconia. Moving south, they crossed the Evrotas River, the frontier of Sparta, which no hostile army had breached in memory. The Spartans, unwilling to engage the massive army in battle, simply defended their city, which the Thebans did not attempt to capture. The Thebans and their allies ravaged Laconia, down to the port of Gythium, freeing some of the Lacedaemonian perioeci from their allegiance to Sparta. Epaminondas briefly returned to Arcadia, before marching south again, this time to Messenia, a region which the Spartans had conquered some 200 years before. Epaminondas freed the helots of Messenia, and rebuilt the ancient city of Messene on Mount Ithome, with fortifications that were among the strongest in Greece. He then issued a call to Messenian exiles all over Greece to return and rebuild their homeland. The loss of Messenia was particularly damaging to the Spartans, since the territory comprised one-third of Sparta's territory and contained half of their helot population. It had been the helots' labor which had allowed the Spartans to become a "full-time" army.

Epaminondas' campaign of 370/369 BC has been described as an example of "the grand strategy of indirect approach", which was aimed at severing "the economic roots of her [Sparta's] military supremacy." In mere months, Epaminondas had created two new enemy states that opposed Sparta, shaken the foundations of Sparta's economy, and all but devastated Sparta's prestige. This accomplished, he led his army back home, victorious.

==== Trial ====
In order to accomplish all that he wished in the Peloponnesus, Epaminondas had persuaded his fellow Boeotarchs to remain in the field for several months after their term of office had expired. Upon his return home, Epaminondas was therefore greeted not with a hero's welcome but with a trial arranged by his political enemies. According to Cornelius Nepos, in his defense Epaminondas merely requested that, if he be executed, the inscription regarding the verdict read:

Epaminondas was punished by the Thebans with death, because he obliged them to overthrow the Lacedaemonians at Leuctra, whom, before he was general, none of the Boeotians durst look upon in the field, and because he not only, by one battle, rescued Thebes from destruction, but also secured liberty for all Greece, and brought the power of both people to such a condition, that the Thebans attacked Sparta, and the Lacedaemonians were content if they could save their lives; nor did he cease to prosecute the war, till, after settling Messene, he shut up Sparta with a close siege.

The jury broke into laughter, the charges were dropped, and Epaminondas was re-elected as Boeotarch for the next year. (Note: Certain modern scholars do not believe that an actual trial took place.)

==== Second invasion of the Peloponnesus (369 BC) ====
In 369 BC the Argives, Eleans and the Arcadians, eager to continue their war against Sparta, once more called on Thebes to support them. Epaminondas, at the height of his prestige, again commanded an allied invasion force. Arriving at the isthmus of Corinth, the Thebans found it heavily guarded by both Spartans and Athenians (along with the Corinthians, Megarans and Pellenians). Epaminondas decided to attack the weakest spot, guarded by the Spartans; in a dawn attack he forced his way through their position, and joined his Peloponnesian allies. The Thebans thus won an easy victory and crossed the Isthmus. Diodorus stresses that this was "a feat no whit inferior to his former mighty deeds".

However, the rest of the expedition achieved little: Sicyon and Pellene became allied to Thebes, and the countryside of Troezen and Epidaurus was ravaged, but the cities could not be taken. After an abortive attack on Corinth and the arrival of a relief force sent by Dionysius of Syracuse to aid Sparta, the Thebans decided to march home.

==== Thessaly (368 BC) ====
When Epaminondas returned to Thebes, he continued to be dogged by his political enemies who prosecuted him for the second time. They actually succeeded in excluding him from the office of Boeotarch for the year 368 BC. This was the only time from the Battle of Leuctra until his death that he did not serve as Boeotarch. In 368, the Theban army marched into Thessaly to rescue Pelopidas and Ismenias, who had been imprisoned by Alexander of Pherae while serving as ambassadors. The Theban force not only failed to overcome Alexander and his allies, but got into serious difficulties, when it tried to withdraw; Epaminondas, serving as a private soldier, succeeded in extricating it. In early 367, Epaminondas led a second Theban expedition to free Pelopidas, and Ismenias. He finally outmanoeuvred the Thessalians, and secured the release of the two Theban ambassadors without a fight.

==== Third invasion of the Peloponnesus (367 BC) ====
In the spring of 367 BC, Epaminondas again invaded the Peloponnesus. This time an Argive army captured part of the Isthmus on Epaminondas's request, allowing the Theban army to enter the Peloponnesus unhindered. On this occasion, Epaminondas marched to Achaea, seeking to secure their allegiance to Thebes. No army dared to challenge him in the field, and the Achaean oligarchies therefore acquiesced to the request that they be allied to Thebes. Epaminondas' acceptance of the Achaean oligarchies roused protests by both the Arcadians and his political rivals, and his settlement was thus shortly reversed: democracies were set up, and the oligarchs exiled. These democratic governments were short-lived, since the pro-Spartan aristocrats from all the cities banded together and attacked each city in turn, re-establishing the oligarchies. According to G.L. Cawkwell, "the sequel perhaps showed the good sense of Epaminondas. When these exiles recovered the cities, they 'no longer took a middle course'." In the light of their treatment by Thebes, they abandoned their previously neutral stance, and thereafter "fought zealously in support of the Lacedaemonians".

==== Resistance to Thebes ====
The Theban hegemony; power-blocks in Greece in the decade up to 362 BC

In 366/365 BC an attempt was made to make a common peace, with the Persian King Artaxerxes II as arbiter and guarantor. Thebes organized a conference to have the terms of the peace accepted, but their diplomatic initiative failed: the negotiations could not resolve the hostility between Thebes and other states that resented its influence (such as the Arcadian leader Lycomedes who challenged the right of the Thebans to hold the congress in Thebes); the peace was never fully accepted, and fighting soon resumed. George Cawkwell believes that Thebes had concrete gains from the congress: "The peace of 366/5 set the seal on Epaminondas' Peloponnesian policy. Under it the remaining members of the Peloponnesian league finally abandoned Sparta, and recognized the independence of Messenia and, presumably, the unification of Boeotia."

Throughout the decade after the Battle of Leuctra, numerous former allies of Thebes defected to the Spartan alliance or even to alliances with other hostile states. By the middle of the next decade, even some Arcadians (whose league Epaminondas had helped establish in 369 BC) had turned against them. At the same time, however, Epaminondas managed through a series of diplomatic efforts to dismantle the Peloponnesian league: the remaining members of the league finally abandoned Sparta (in 365 Corinth, Epidaurus, and Phlius made peace with Thebes and Argos), (Note: Although Corinth refused to join in an alliance with Thebes, mading it plain that it wanted only peace) and Messenia remained independent and firmly loyal to Thebes.

Boeotian armies campaigned across Greece as opponents rose up on all sides; Epaminondas even led his state in a challenge to Athens at sea. The Theban demos voted him a fleet of a hundred triremes to win over Rhodes, Chios, and Byzantium. The fleet finally sailed in 364, but modern scholars believe that Epaminondas achieved no lasting gains for Thebes on this voyage. In that same year, Pelopidas was killed while campaigning against Alexander of Pherae in Thessaly. His loss deprived Epaminondas of his greatest Theban political ally.

==== Fourth invasion of the Peloponnesus (362 BC) ====
In the face of this increasing opposition to Theban dominance, Epaminondas launched his final expedition into the Peloponnese in 362 BC. The immediate goal of the expedition was to subdue Mantinea, which had been opposing Theban influence in the region. Epaminondas brought an army drawn from Boeotia, Thessaly and Euboea. He was joined by Tegea, which was the center of local opposition to Mantinea, Argos, Messenia, and some of the Arcadians. Mantinea, on the other hand, had requested assistance from Sparta, Athens, Achaea and the rest of Arcadia, so that almost all of Greece was represented on one side or the other.

This time the mere presence of the Theban army was not enough to cow the opposition. Since time was passing and the Mantinean alliance showed no signs of capsizing, Epaminondas decided that he would have to break the stalemate. Hearing that a large Lacedaemonian force was marching to Mantinea, and that Sparta was practically undefended, he planned an audacious night-time march on Sparta itself. However, the Spartan king Agesilaus was alerted to this move by an informant, probably a Cretan runner, and Epaminondas arrived to find the city well-defended. Although he did attack the city, he seems to have drawn off relatively quickly on discovering that he had not, after all, surprised the Spartans. Furthermore, the Lacedaemonian and Mantinean troops which had been stationed at Mantinea had marched to Sparta during the course of the day, and dissuaded Epaminondas from attacking again. Now hoping that his adversaries had left Mantinea defenseless in their haste to protect Sparta, Epaminondas counter marched his troops back to his base at Tegea, and then dispatched his cavalry to Mantinea. However, a clash outside the walls of Mantinea with Athenian cavalry foiled this strategy as well. Realising that the time allotted for the campaign was drawing to a close, and reasoning that if he departed without defeating the enemies of Tegea, Theban influence in the Peloponnesus would be destroyed, he decided to stake everything on a pitched battle.

==== Battle of Mantinea ====
What followed on the plain in front of Mantinea was the largest hoplite battle in Greek history. Epaminondas had the larger army, 30,000 infantry and 3,000 cavalry, whilst his opponents numbered 20,000 infantry and 2,000 cavalry.Xenophon says that, having decided to fight, Epaminondas arranged the army into battle order, and then marched it in a column parallel to the Mantinean lines, so that it appeared that the army was marching elsewhere, and would not fight that day. Having reached a certain point in the march, he then had the army down arms, so it appeared they were getting ready to camp. Xenophon suggests that "by so doing he caused among most of the enemy a relaxation of their mental readiness for fighting, and likewise a relaxation of their readiness as regards their array for battle". The whole column, which had been marching right-to-left past the front of the Mantinean army then 'right-faced', so that they were now in a battle line, facing the Mantineans. Epaminondas, who had been at the head of the column (now the left wing), brought some companies of infantry from the extreme right wing, behind the battle line, to reinforce the left wing. By this, he recreated the strengthened left-wing that Thebes had fielded at Leuctra (this time probably made up by all the Boeotians, and not just the Thebans as at Leuctra). On the wings he placed strong forces of cavalry strengthened by light-infantry.

Epaminondas then gave the order to advance, catching the enemy off guard, and causing a furious scramble in the Mantinean camp to prepare for battle. The battle unfolded as Epaminondas had planned. The cavalry forces on the wings drove back the Athenian and Mantinean cavalry opposite them. Diodorus says that the Athenian cavalry on the Mantinean right wing, although not inferior in quality, could not withstand the missiles from the light-troops that Epaminondas had placed among the Theban cavalry. Meanwhile, the Theban infantry advanced. Xenophon evocatively describes Epaminondas's thinking: "[he] led forward his army prow on, like a trireme, believing that if he could strike and cut through anywhere, he would destroy the entire army of his adversaries. As at Leuctra, the weakened right wing was ordered to hold back and avoid fighting. In the clash of infantry, the issue briefly hung in the balance, but then the Theban left-wing broke through the Spartan line, and the entire enemy phalanx was put to flight. However, at the height of the battle, Epaminondas was mortally wounded by a Spartan, and died shortly thereafter. Following his death, the Thebes and allies made no effort to pursue the fleeing enemy; a testament to Epaminondas's centrality to the war effort.

== Death ==
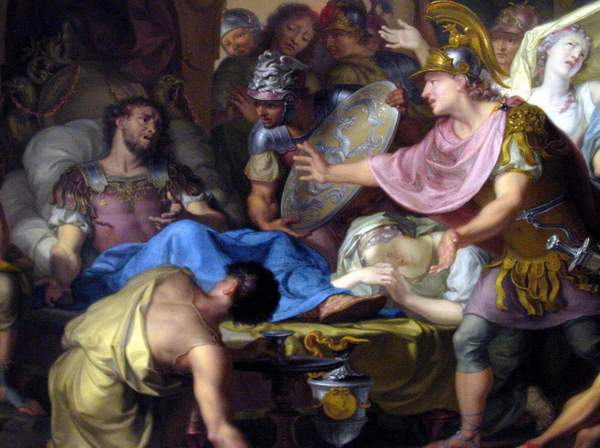
Isaak Walraven, The Death of Epaminondas (1726), Rijksmuseum Amsterdam

While pressing forward with the troops at Mantinea, Epaminondas was hit in the chest by a spear (or, in some accounts, a sword or large knife). Cornelius Nepos suggests the Spartans were deliberately aiming at Epaminondas in the hope of killing him, and thereby demoralizing the Thebans. The enemy who struck the killing blow was variously identified as Anticrates, Machaerion, or Gryllus, son of Xenophon.

The spear broke, leaving the iron point in his body, and Epaminondas collapsed. The Thebans around him fought desperately to stop the Spartans taking possession of his body. When he was carried back to camp still living, he asked which side was victorious. When he was told that the Boeotians had won, he said "It is time to die." Diodorus suggests that one of his friends exclaimed "You die childless, Epaminondas" and then burst into tears. In response, Epaminondas is supposed to have replied "No, by Zeus, on the contrary I leave behind two daughters, Leuctra and Mantinea, my victories." Cornelius Nepos, whose story is otherwise similar has the last words of Epaminondas as "I have lived long enough; for I die unconquered." When the spear point was withdrawn, Epaminondas quickly died. In accordance with Greek custom, he was buried on the battlefield.

== Assessments ==
=== Character ===
In matters of character, Epaminondas was above reproach in the eyes of the ancient historians who recorded his deeds. Contemporaries praised him for disdaining material wealth, sharing what he had with his friends, and refusing bribes. One of the last heirs of the Pythagorean tradition, he appears to have lived a simple and ascetic lifestyle even when his leadership had raised him to a position at the head of all Greece. Cornelius Nepos notes his incorruptibility, describing his rejection of a Persian ambassador who came to him with a bribe. These aspects of his character contributed greatly to his renown after his death.

Epaminondas never married and as such was subject to criticism from countrymen who believed he was duty-bound to provide the country with the benefit of sons as great as himself. In response, Epaminondas said that his victory at Leuctra was a daughter destined to live forever. He is known, however, to have had several young male lovers, a standard pedagogic practice in ancient Greece, and one that Thebes in particular was famous for; Plutarch records that the Theban lawgivers instituted the practice "to temper the manners and characters of the youth". An anecdote told by Cornelius Nepos indicates that Epaminondas was intimate with a young man by the name of Micythus. Plutarch also mentions two of his beloveds (eromenoi): Asopichus, who fought together with him at the battle of Leuctra, where he greatly distinguished himself; and Caphisodorus, who fell with Epaminondas at Mantineia and was buried by his side.

In Gulliver's Travels, he is described as one of the six most virtuous and noble men who have lived.

=== Military record ===
Extant biographies of Epaminondas universally describe him as one of the most talented generals ever produced by the Greek city-states. Even Xenophon, who fails to note his presence at Leuctra, says of his Mantinean campaign: "Now I for my part could not say that his campaign proved fortunate; yet of all possible deeds of forethought and daring the man seems to me to have left not one undone." Diodorus is effusive in his praise for Epaminondas's military record:

For it seems to me that he surpassed his contemporaries...in skill and experience in the art of war. For among the generation of Epaminondas were famous men: Pelopidas the Theban, Timotheus and Conon, also Chabrias and Iphicrates...Agesilaus the Spartan, who belonged to a slightly older generation. Still earlier than these, in the times of the Medes and Persians, there were Solon, Themistocles, Miltiades, and Cimon, Myronides, and Pericles and certain others in Athens, and in Sicily Gelon, son of Deinomenes, and still others. All the same, if you should compare the qualities of these with the generalship and reputation of Epaminondas, you would find the qualities possessed by Epaminondas far superior.

As a tactician, Epaminondas stands above every other general in Greek history, except kings Philip II and Alexander the Great, although modern historians have questioned his larger strategic vision. According to Richard A. Gabriel, his tactics "marked the beginning of the end of traditional Greek methods of war". His innovative strategy at Leuctra allowed him to defeat the vaunted Spartan phalanx with a smaller force, and his decision to refuse his right flank was the first recorded instance of such a tactic. Many of the tactical innovations that Epaminondas implemented would also be used by Philip II, who in his youth spent time as a hostage in Thebes and may have learned directly from Epaminondas himself. (Note: Philip also "revived Epaminondas' strategy of mobilizing Sparta's neighbors".)

== Legacy ==
In some ways Epaminondas dramatically altered the face of Greece during the 10 years in which he was the central figure of Greek politics. By the time of his death, Sparta had been humbled, Messenia freed, and the Peloponnese completely reorganized. In another respect, however, he left behind a Greece no different from that which he had found; the bitter divides and animosities existing in Greece for over a century remained as they had been before Leuctra. The brutal internecine warfare that had characterized the years from 432 BC onwards continued unabated until all the city-states involved were defeated by Macedon.

At Mantinea, Thebes had faced down the combined forces of the greatest city-states of Greece, but the tactical victory was a strategic draw. With Epaminondas removed from the scene, the Thebans returned to their more traditional defensive policy, and within a few years, Athens had replaced them at the pinnacle of the Greek political system. No Greek state ever again reduced Boeotia to the subjection it had known during the Spartan hegemony, but Theban influence faded quickly in the rest of Greece. Finally, at Chaeronea in 338 BC, the combined forces of Thebes and Athens were defeated by Philip, and Theban independence was put to an end. Three years later, heartened by a false rumor that Alexander had been assassinated, the Thebans revolted; Alexander squashed the revolt, then destroyed the city, slaughtering or enslaving all its citizens, a mere 27 years after the death of the man who had made Thebes hegemonic throughout Greece.

Epaminondas was celebrated throughout the Greco-Roman world as one of the greatest men in Greek history. Cicero eulogized him as "the first man, in my judgement, of Greece," and Pausanias records an honorary poem from his tomb:

By my counsels was Sparta shorn of her glory,
And holy Messene received at last her children.
By the arms of Thebes was Megalopolis encircled with walls,
And all Greece won independence and freedom.

Epaminondas's actions were certainly welcomed by the Messenians and others whom he assisted in his campaigns against the Spartans. Those same Spartans, however, had been at the center of resistance to the Persian invasions of the 5th century BC, and their absence was sorely felt at Chaeronea; the endless warfare in which Epaminondas played a central role weakened the cities of Greece until they could no longer hold their own against their neighbors to the north. As Epaminondas campaigned to secure freedom for the Boeotians and others throughout Greece, he brought closer the day when all of Greece would be subjugated by Philip of Macedon. Victor Davis Hanson has suggested that Epaminondas may have planned for a united Greece composed of regional democratic federations, but even if this assertion is correct, no such plan was ever implemented. Simon Hornblower asserts that Thebes' great legacy to fourth century and Hellenistic Greece was federalism, "a kind of alternative to imperialism, a way of achieving unity without force", which "embodies a representative principle".

For all his noble qualities, Epaminondas was unable to transcend the Greek city-state system, with its endemic rivalry and warfare, and thus left Greece more war-ravaged but no less divided than he found it. Hornblower asserts that "it is a sign of Epaminondas' political failure, even before the battle of Mantinea, that his Peloponnesian allies fought to reject Sparta rather than because of the positive attractions of Thebes". On the other hand, Cawkwell concludes that "Epaminondas must be judged not in relation to these inevitable limitations of Boeotian power. To have established the power of Boeotia and ended the Spartan domination of the Peloponnese was the most and the best that a Boeotian could have done."

== Bibliography ==
=== Ancient sources ===
- Diodorus Siculus (1952) [1st century BC]. Diodorus of Sicily in Twelve Volumes (in Greek and English). Vol. 7. Translated by Sherman, Charles L. Cambridge, Massachusetts: Harvard University Press. pp. 197–199.
- Nepos, Cornelius (1790) [after c. 70 BC]. "Epaminondas VIII". Lives of the Excellent Commanders (in Latin and English). Translated by Clarke, John (14th ed.). London: Rivington. pp. 136–148.
- Pausanias (1965) [2nd century]. Description of Greece. Vol. 4. Translated by Jones, W.H.S. Cambridge, Massachusetts; London: Harvard University Press; William Heinemann Ltd.
- Plutarch (1955) [after c. 66]. "Pelopidas". Plutarch's Lives. Vol. 5. Translated by Perin, Bernadotte. Cambridge, Massachusetts: Harvard University Press. pp. 339–434.
- Thucydides (1933) [c. 450 BC]. "Book 5, ch. 7". History of the Peloponnesian War. Translated by Crawley, Richard. London; Toronto: J.M. Dent & Sons Ltd; E.P. Dutton & Co.
- Xenophon (1921) [after c. 362 BC]. "Book VII". Hellenica: Books VI & VII; Anabasis: Books I & III (in Greek and English). Translated by Brownson, Carleton L. London; New York: William Heinemann; G. P. Putnam's Sons.

=== Modern sources ===
- Beck, Hans (2008). Central Greece and the Politics of Power in the Fourth Century BC. Cambridge University Press. ISBN 978-0-521-83705-7.
- Bose, Partha Sarathi (2003). "Introduction". Alexander the Great's Art of Strategy: the timeless leadership lessons of history's greatest empire builder. New York: Gotham Books. ISBN 978-1-59240-053-9.
- Buck, Robert J. (1994). Boiotia and the Boiotian League, 432–371 B.C. Edmonton: University of Alberta Press. ISBN 978-08886-4-253-0.
- Buckley, Terry (2010). Aspects of Greek History, 750–323 BC: a Source-Based Approach (2nd ed.). London: Routledge. ISBN 978-0-415-09958-5.
- Cartledge, Paul (1979). Sparta and Lakonia. London: Routledge. ISBN 978-0-7100-0377-5.
- Cawkwell, George (1979) [1966]. "Introduction". A History of My Times. London: Penguin Books. ISBN 978-0-14-044175-8.
- Cawkwell, George (1972). "Epaminondas and Thebes". The Classical Quarterly. New Series. 22 (2): 254–278. doi:10.1017/S0009838800042063. ISSN 0009-8388. JSTOR 638208. S2CID 170698566.
- Davis, Paul K. (2001). 100 Decisive Battles: from ancient times to the present. Oxford: Oxford University Press. ISBN 978-0-19-514366-9.
- Fine, John Van Antwerp (1983). The Ancient Greeks: A Critical History. Cambridge, Massachusetts: Harvard University Press. ISBN 978-0-385-72059-5.
- Fortina, Marcello (1958). Epaminonda (in Italian). Turin: Società Editrice Internazionale.
- Gabriel, Richard A. (2001). "Philip II of Macedon". Great Captains of Antiquity. Greenwood Publishing Group. ISBN 978-0-313-31285-4.
- Green, Peter (2007). Alexander the Great and the Hellenistic Age. London: Orion. ISBN 978-0-7538-2413-9.
- Hanson, Victor Davis (1993). Hoplites: the Classical Greek Battle Experience. The Free Press. ISBN 978-0-415-09816-8.
- Hanson, Victor Davis (1999). The Soul of Battle: From Ancient Times to the Present Day, How Three Great Liberators Vanquished Tyranny. The Free Press. ISBN 978-0-385-72059-5.
- Holland, Tom (2006). Persian Fire: The First World Empire and the Battle for the West. Doubleday. ISBN 978-0-385-51311-1.
- Hornblower, Simon; Spawforth, Antony, eds. (2003). The Oxford Classical Dictionary (3rd ed.). Oxford University Press. ISBN 978-0-19-866172-6.
- Hornblower, Simon (2006). The Greek World, 479–323 BC. Independence: Taylor & Francis. ISBN 978-0-416-75000-3.
- Hubbard, Thomas K., ed. (2003). Homosexuality in Greece and Rome: A Sourcebook of Basic Documents. University of California Press. ISBN 978-0-520-23430-7.
- Joint Association of Classical Teachers (1984). The World of Athens: an introduction to classical Athenian culture. Cambridge University Press. ISBN 978-0-521-27389-3.
- Jones, Archer (1987). The Art of War in the Western World. University of Illinois Press. ISBN 978-0-385-72059-5.
- Kagan, Donald (1990). The Archidamian War. Ithaca; London: Cornell University Press. ISBN 978-0-8014-9714-8.
- Lazenby, J.F. (1993). The Defence of Greece 490–479 BC. Warminster, UK: Aris & Phillips Ltd. ISBN 978-0-85668-591-0.
- Liddell Hart, Basil Henry (1954). Strategy. New York: Praeger. OCLC 924449843.
- Luraghi, Nino (2008). The Ancient Messenians: Constructions of Ethnicity and Memory. Cambridge: Cambridge University Press. ISBN 978-0-521-85587-7.
- Ober, Josiah (1985). Fortress Attica : Defense of the Athenian Land Frontier, 404–322 B.C. Lieden: Brill. ISBN 978-90-04-07243-5.
- Roy, J. (2000). "Sparta in the 360s BC". In Edwards, I.E.S.; Lewis, D.M.; Boardman, John; Gadd, Cyril John; Geoffrey, Nicholas; Hammond, Lemprière (eds.). The Cambridge Ancient History: the Fourth Century BC. Cambridge University Press. ISBN 978-0-521-23348-4.
- Sage, Michael (2002). Warfare in Ancient Greece: A Sourcebook. London: Routledge. ISBN 978-11347-6-332-0.
- Seager, Robin (2000). Edwards, I.E.L. (ed.). The Cambridge Ancient History: the Fourth Century BC. Cambridge University Press. ISBN 978-0-521-23348-4.
- Sealey, Raphael (1976). A History of the Greek City States 700–338 BC. Berkeley: University of California Press. ISBN 978-0-520-03177-7.
- Stylianou, P.J. (1998). A Historical Commentary on Diodorus Siculus: Book 15. Oxford Classical Monographs. Oxford: Clarendon Press. ISBN 978-0-19-815239-2.
- Swoboda, Heinrich (1905), "Epameinondas 1", Realencyclopädie der classischen Altertumswissenschaft, volume 5, part 2, columns 2674–2707.
- Tritle, Lawrence A., ed. (1997). The Greek World in the Fourth Century. Routledge. ISBN 978-0-415-10582-8.
- Tufano, Salvatore (2023). Epaminonda di Tebe: vita e sconfitte di un politico di successo. Milan: LED. ISBN 9788855131001.
