= Tegyra =

Site of an oracle of Apollo

Coordinates: 38°32′03″N 22°57′28″E

Tegyra (Ancient Greek: Τεγύρα or Τέγυρα), also: Tegyrae (Ancient Greek: Τεγύραι, romanized: Tegyrai) was a town of ancient Boeotia, the site of an oracle and temple of Apollo, who was even said to have been born there. It was the site of the Battle of Tegyra in 375 BCE. It was located north of Lake Copais, above the marshes of the river Melas. Its location has been identified with sparse remains 5 km (3 mi) northeast of Orchomenus, a hill with springs at the base, the head of the Polygira tributary of the Melas. J.M. Fossey, however, placed Tegyra at modern Pyrgos, 7 km. further east, and thought the Polygira site was Homeric Aspledon.

== See also ==
- Delos Mountain
