= Siege of Mantinea =

385 BC battle

Coordinates: 37°37′3.51″N 22°23′34.33″E

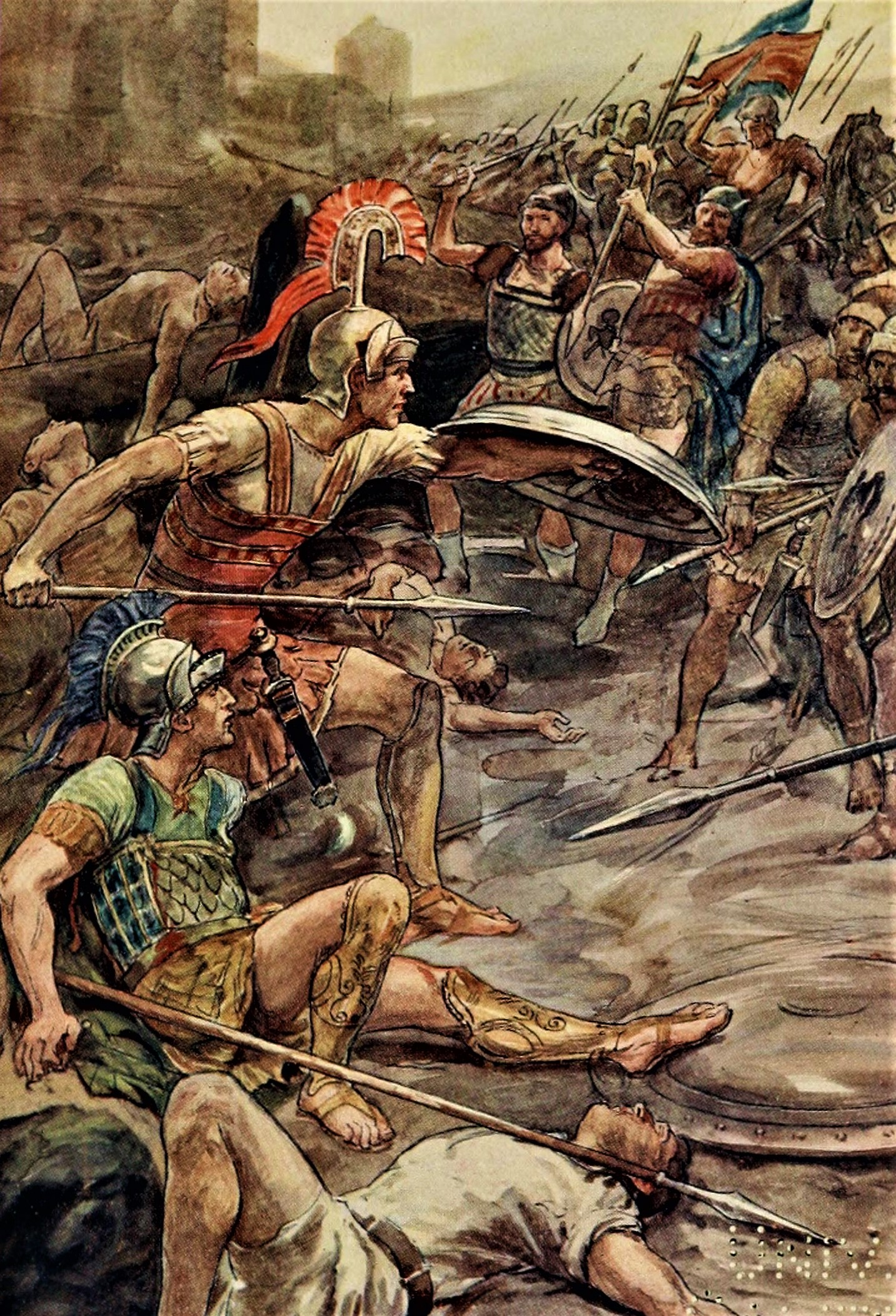
- Epaminondas defending Pelopidas (William Rainey, 1900)
Date	385 BC
Location	Mantineia
Result	Lacedaemonian victory

Belligerents
Lacedaemon	Mantineia

Commanders and leaders
Agesipolis I Epaminondas	Pelopidas

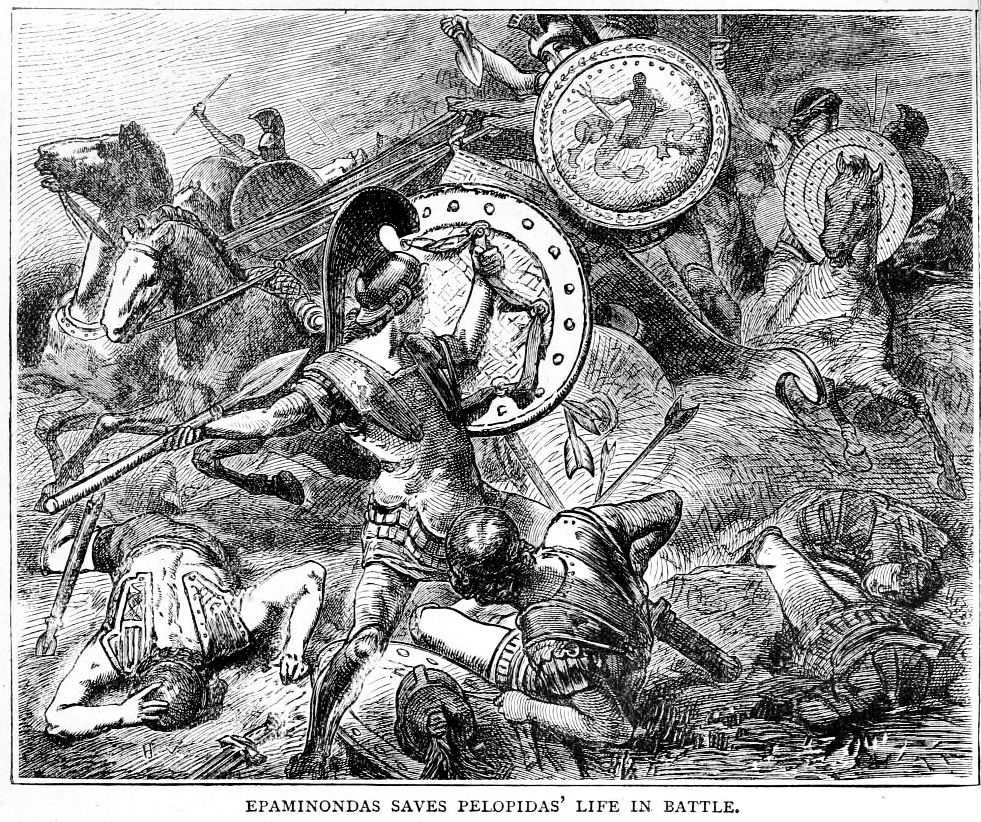
Epaminondas saves the life of Pelopidas in battle

The Siege of Mantinea occurred in 385 BC, and resulted in a victory of the Spartans over the city of Mantinea, which was defeated and dismembered. The Spartans wanted to ensure that Mantinea would not develop into a threat to their own power, and ordered them to take down their walls, but they refused. With that excuse, the Spartans diverted the river onto the walls by breaking dams and digging canals to make them crumble, since the Mantineans refused to come out and were able to resist a siege for many months ahead. Once trapped in the flooded city, they were forced to fight, and the Spartans pushed the Theban forces on the forefront only to attack with their cavalry at the end and finish the enemy. On this occasion, Epaminondas, then fighting on the side of the Spartans, famously rescued his fellow Theban Pelopidas.

Mantinea had been opposed to the Spartans in the Peloponesian War. As a result, Mantinea first fell in 417 BC, and it was then destroyed in the siege of 385 BC. However, the Arcadians were able to recover and restored their city after the Battle of Leuctra and the defeat of Spartan hegemony.
