= Battle of Mantinea (362 BC) =

Battle during the Boeotian War

- Part of the Theban–Spartan War
Date	4 July 362 BC
Location	Near Mantineia, Arcadia 37.6°N 22.4°E
Result	Theban tactical victory Strategic draw

Belligerents
Thebes and Boeotian League; Tegea, Megalopolis and other Arcadian allies of Thebes; Argos; Thessalian allies of Thebes; Messene; Euboeans; Sicyon; Locrain allies of Thebes; Aenianians; Malians	Athens and Second Athenian League; Mantineia; Sparta; Elis; Achaeans

Commanders and leaders
Epaminondas †; Daiphantus †; Iolaidas †	Cephisodorus of Marathon †; Podares of Mantinea †

Strength
25,000–30,000 men 3,000 cavalry	20,000 hoplites 2,000 cavalry including 6,000 Athenians and 1,000 Spartans

Casualties and losses
6,000	12,000
- Location of the battle near Mantinea

The Battle of Mantinea was fought on 4 July 362 BC between the Thebans, led by Epaminondas and supported by the Arcadians, Argives, Messenians, Thessalians, Euboeans and the Boeotian league against the Spartans, Eleans, Athenians, and Mantineans. The battle was to determine which of the two alliances would dominate Greece. However, the death of Epaminondas and his intended successors would cost Thebes the military leadership and initiative to maintain Theban supremacy in the region. Similarly, the Spartans were weakened by yet another defeat and loss of troops. Epaminondas's death coupled with the impact on the Spartans of yet another defeat weakened both alliances, and paved the way for Macedonian conquest led by Philip II of Macedon.

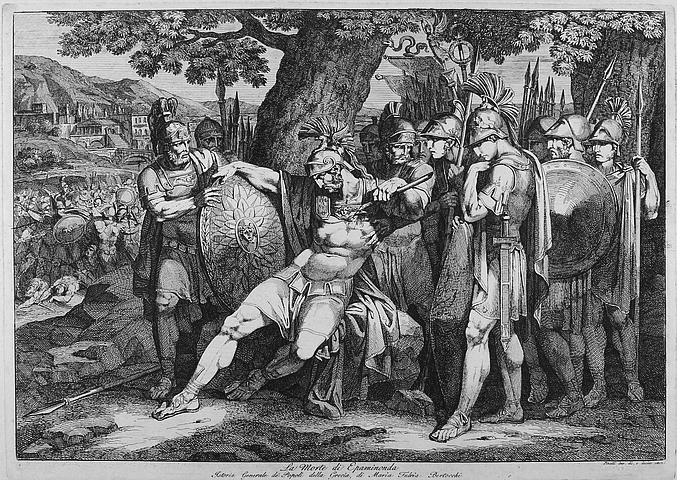
The death of Epaminondas at the Battle of Mantinea

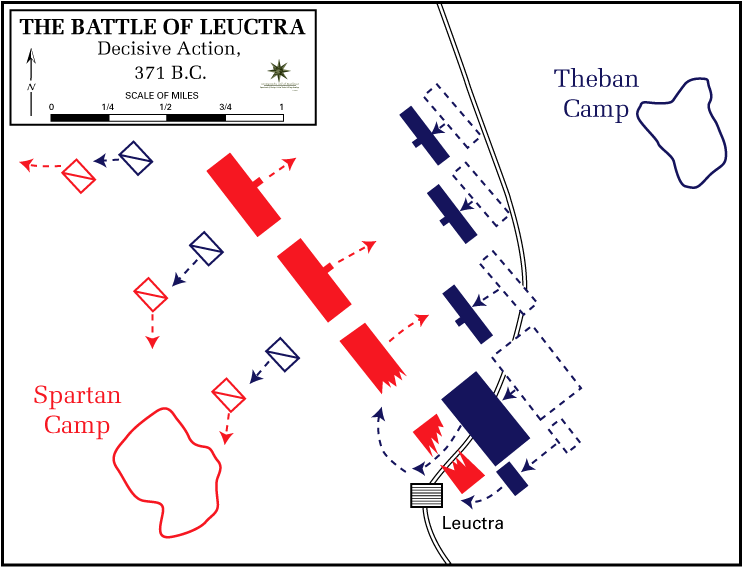
Troop formations of the Theban and Spartan armies at the Battle of Leuctra. Epaminondas used a similar oblique formation at Mantinea.

== Background ==
During the Peloponnesian War (431–404 B.C.), Thebes allied with the Spartans against Athens. After Sparta's victory against Athens, the Thebans were told that their forts were to be garrisoned by Spartan troops. This decision changed the relationship between Thebes and Sparta from one of allyship to one of occupation by the Spartans. Greek General and Statesman Epaminondas (in some sources spelt Epameinondas) headed a revolt against the garrison of Spartan troops in Boeotian territory in 378 B.C. A significant blow to Spartan hegemony occurred during the Battle of Leuctra in 371 B.C., where Epaminondas stacked his left flank 50 men deep with elite Theban Soldiers of the Sacred Band led by General Pelopidas in anticipation that the Spartans' strongest soldiers would traditionally be stacked on the right flank. This strategy proved fruitful for Thebes as the battle cost the lives of many Spartans, including King Cleombrotus. The battle of Leuctra "led, undeniably, to a wholly different world, in which the Spartans were badly weakened and Thebans wildly emboldened."

After the Battle of Leuctra in 371 B.C. had shattered the foundations of Spartan hegemony, Thebes attempted to build a new hegemony. Epaminondas, the city's chief statesman and general from 420 B.C. to his death, was highly regarded for his military prowess and his tendency to promote virtues such as simplicity and perseverance. The historian Diodorus Siculus stated that after the Battle of Leuctra, Epaminondas "became the foremost man, not only of Thebes, but of all who lived in his time". Due to the high regard from his subjects and recent military victory, Epaminondas sought to continue to expand and establish Theban supremacy. Consequently, the Thebans had marched south into the area traditionally dominated by the Spartans and set up the Arcadian League, a federation of city-states of the central Peloponnesian plateau to contain Spartan influence in the Peloponnese and thereby maintain overall Theban control. At the behest of the Arcadian League in 370 B.C., Epaminondas led a winter campaign in Laconia, plundering the countryside while King Agesilaus II could only watch in Sparta. Epaminondas ended this campaign by repopulating Messene, the capital of Messenia, fortifying it with the finest stone walls in all of Greece, causing Sparta to be surrounded with enemies on all sides. Subsequently, a Persian diplomatic intervention in 368 B.C. spearheaded by Artaxerxes II attempted to negotiate peace among the Greeks, but Sparta desired to continue the war to regain Messenia, while Thebes desired to conquer all of Boeotia, ending any chance of successful negotiations.

Beginning in 367 B.C., Epaminondas led a bloodless expedition into Achaea with Argive support, installing pro-Theban factions and Theban governors in the region, but these regimes were quickly replaced by Achaean aristocrats who aligned themselves with Sparta as soon as Epaminondas left Achaea.

In years prior to the Battle of Mantinea, the Spartans had joined with the Eleans (a minor Peloponnesian people with a territorial grudge against the Arcadians) in an effort to undermine the League. When the Arcadians seized the Pan-Hellenic sanctuary of Zeus at Olympia in Elis and celebrated the Olympic Games in 364 B.C., the Eleans counterattacked and instilled fear into the Arcadians. In the aftermath of this incident, one of the Arcadian city-states, Mantinea, passed a resolution to stop funding the elite epariti with funds from the sanctuary, causing the attempted ejection of Mantinea from the league and eventual disillusionment of Mantinea with the Arcadian League and Thebes. Diplomatically isolated, the Mantineans sent envoys to Athens and Sparta, causing them to join the Mantineans in a military attack on the Arcadian League, rallying at Mantinea. Athens decided to support the Spartans, as they resented the growing Theban power. The Athenians also recalled that at the end of Peloponnesian War, the Thebans had demanded that Athens be destroyed and its inhabitants enslaved; the Spartans had resisted these demands. An Athenian army was sent by sea to join the Spartan-led forces, in order to avoid being intercepted on land by Theban forces. Epaminondas then led a Theban army into the Peloponnese to restore order and re-establish Theban/Arcadian hegemony there. Knowing that Sparta was undefended due to their troops assembling at Mantinea, Epaminondas led an unsuccessful sneak attack into Sparta in 362 B.C., foiled by a Cretan who happened to witness the Theban march and encounter Agesilaus II, warning him of the attack. Defeated at Sparta, Epaminondas retreated to Tegea, where his allies assembled.

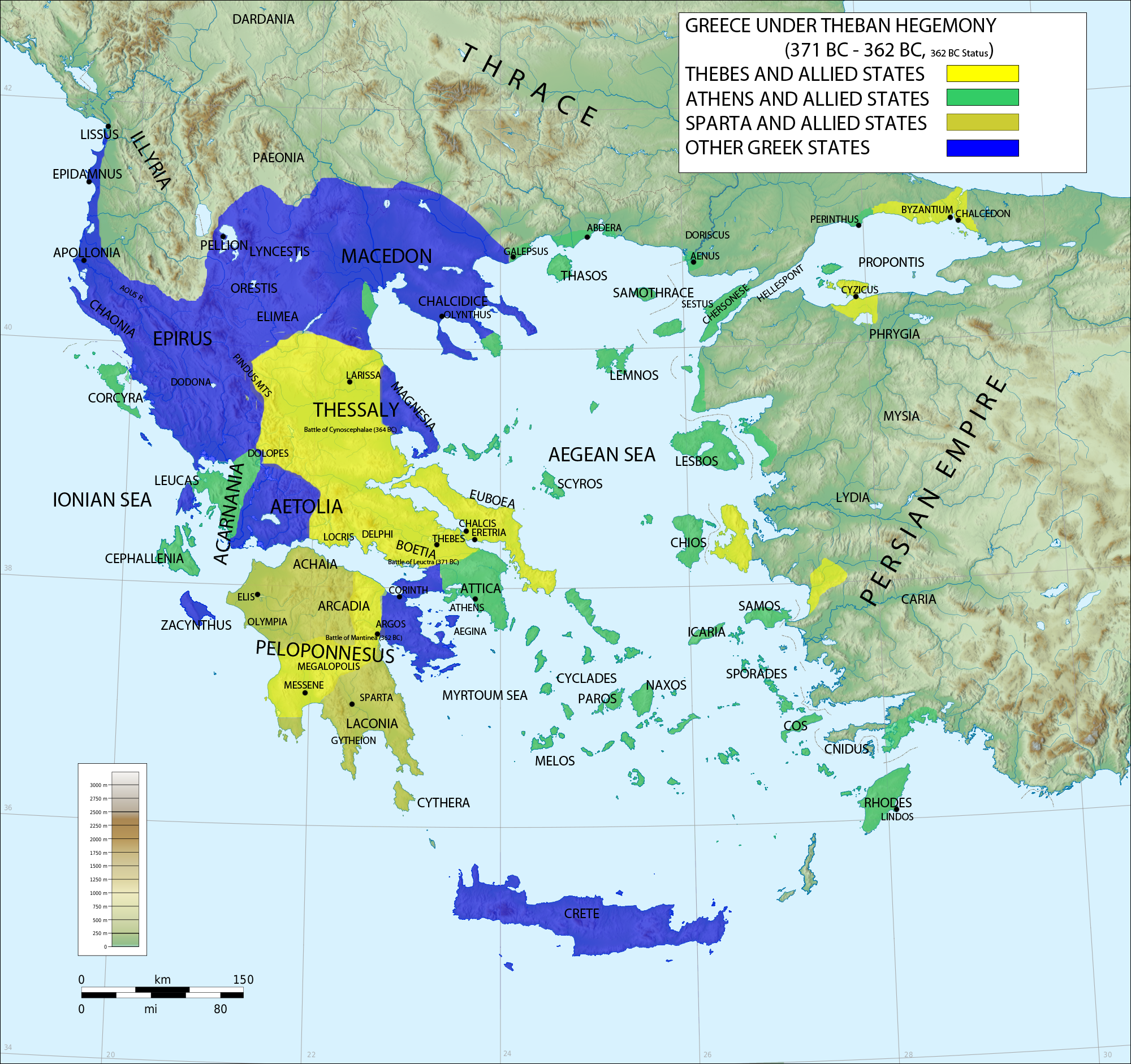
Theban Hegemony by the time of the Battle of Mantinea

== Battle ==
=== Initial skirmish ===
While his army camped in Tegea, Epaminondas sent his cavalry to Mantinea with a mission to raze and plunder the Mantinean countryside. However, the Mantineans begged the Athenian cavalry, who had just stopped at nearby Cleonae for recuperation, to attack the Theban cavalry. Despite being tired and hungry, the Athenian cavalry rode out to Mantinea and successfully engaged the Thebans in a bitter skirmish in which many Athenians, including Gryllus, son of Xenophon, died before routing the Thebans. Due to the consecutive setbacks the Thebans faced so far in this campaign, Epaminondas is said to have believed that he must regain his honour through winning a decisive battle. Xenophon wrote that Epaminondas believed that, since he had so far been unsuccessful in this campaign, "if he were victorious, he would make up for all these things, while if he were slain, he deemed that such an end would be honourable for one who was striving to leave to his fatherland dominion over Peloponnesus."

=== Main action ===
The two armies met near Mantinea in a flat plain hemmed in by two mountains. The Spartans, Athenians, Eleans and Mantineans, alongside smaller contingents of some of the Achaeans and Euboeans, were led by Podares of Mantinea and Cephisodorus of Marathon, the commander of the Athenian cavalry. The strength of the Spartan alliance numbered at 20,000 infantry and 2,000 cavalry, with the Athenians contributing 6,000 and the Spartans contributing 1,000. Epaminondas's Thebans were assisted by the Arcadians loyal to the League, principally those from the city-states of Megalopolis (founded by the Thebans when they were last in the Peloponnese, as the Arcadian federal capital) and Tegea (the traditional leading city-state of the Arcadians), with additional support from most of the Achaeans, Argives, Messenians, and Thessalians. The Theban army included contingents from city-states of the pro-Theban Boeotian League. The Theban cavalry was supported by lightly armed running infantry, known as hamippoi, integrated into the cavalry formation.

Epaminondas maneuvered his army to the west near some mountains, a position that was likely the modern day site of Skopi, giving the impression among his enemies that his army would not battle that day and begin to make camp. Secretly, Epaminondas began to reorganize his formation, moving troops behind other soldiers so that the enemy would not be able to see. He concentrated his best Boeotian troops onto his left in a large phalanx, probably fifty ranks deep. The Arcadians formed their phalanxes on the immediate right of the Boeotians, the Argives held the right, and the rest of the allies filled the middle, with cavalry on the flanks. Ordering his army to advance with the left marching faster than the right, Epaminondas arranged an oblique order attack with the strong Boeotian wedge to break the Spartan right while the enemy army was under the impression that there would be no battle. This tactic allowed the large, dense section of the line to force its way through the thinner classical phalanx. Epaminondas personally led the left from the front line. Xenophon (Hellenika 7.5.23) described the left wing of that Theban army as "like a trireme, with the spur of the prow out in front."

The Theban cavalry and light infantry drove off the enemy cavalry. The wedged Boeotian hoplites smashed into the enemy right, where the Mantineans were positioned. The Mantinean leader Podares offered heroic resistance, but when he was killed, the Mantinean hoplites fled the field. However, as the Mantineans fled, the Spartans made a last-ditch effort to kill Epaminondas before fleeing by throwing their javelins at him, some of which struck his body. Epaminondas was mortally wounded when facing the Spartan phalanx by a man variously identified as Anticrates, Machaerion, or Gryllus, son of Xenophon. Epaminondas's soldiers rescued him as he was dying, placing him at the high point of Skopi, where he watched the battle unfold. The Theban leaders Iolaidas and Daiphantus, whom he intended to succeed him, were also killed. After the death of Epaminondas, the Theban left froze and failed to pursue the retreating Spartans and Mantineans. Meanwhile, on the Theban right, the Theban cavalry was also victorious against the Spartan cavalry and pursued the retreating Spartan cavalry, but the hamippoi attached to the Theban right hastily attacked the Athenian hoplites in euphoria and were slaughtered by the Athenians. The Athenians remained as the only contingent of the allied army to hold their ground.

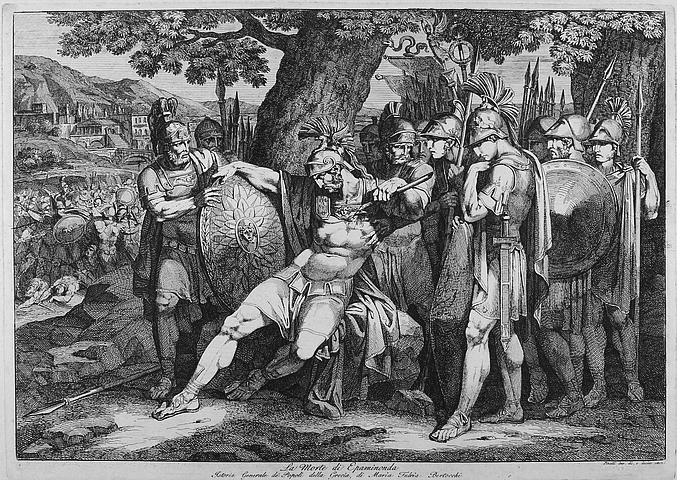
The death of Epaminondas at the Battle of Mantinea

According to Polyaenus, after the battle, the Mantineians wanted to send heralds to the Thebans in order to make an agreement about carrying off the dead, but Cineas persuaded them against such an action.

== Aftermath ==
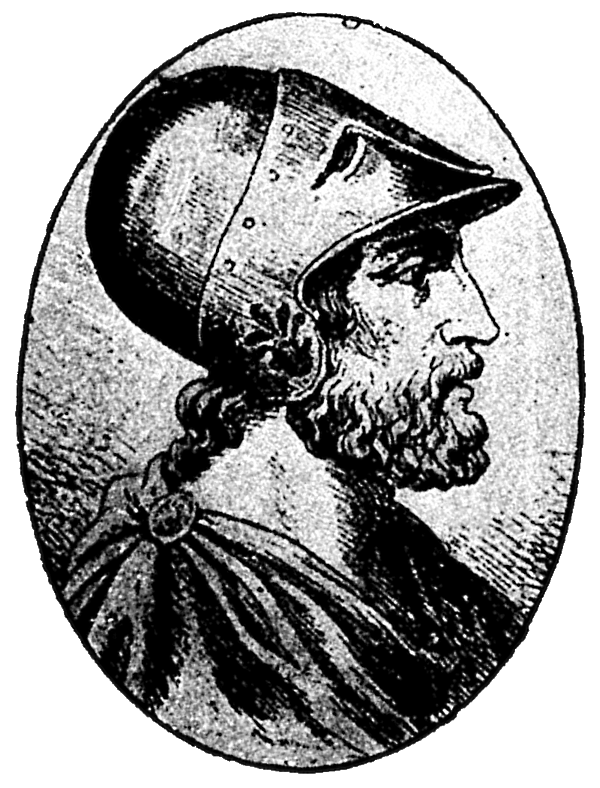
Depiction of Epaminondas

Thebes was struck a heavy blow to their supremacy despite the victory on the battlefield because Epaminondas had been slain. On his deathbed, Epaminondas, upon hearing of the deaths of his fellow leaders, instructed the Thebans to make peace, despite having won the battle. Without his leadership and military capabilities, Theban hopes for hegemony faded. The Spartans, however, having again been defeated in battle, were unable to replace their losses. Since many elite Spartan warriors were slain during the battle, Sparta's military strength was greatly weakened by the conflict. This was because it would take years of training, experience, and resources to produce the seasoned veterans lost in the battle, thus the remnants of the military were left in the hands of the less experienced.

Contemporary historians, such as Xenophon and Ephorus, were disappointed in the indecisive nature of the battle despite the assemblage of the greatest cities of Greece into a single battle. Ancient Greek historiography, focused on a long tradition of sectioning history into epochs, could not make sense of the historical significance of the Battle of Mantinea due to the lack of political or territorial changes the battle brought. The failure for a single hegemon to develop from this battle convinced writers like Xenophon to come to the conclusion that Greece inherently existed in a state of disorder and no clear hegemon would ever emerge.

The ultimate result of the battle was to pave the way for the Macedonian rise as the leading force who subjugated the rest of Greece by exploiting the weakness of both the Thebans and the Spartans. This was because from 368 to 365 B.C. Philip II of Macedon was held captive in Thebes, in which he became mentored by Epaminondas. Under Epaminondas's wing, Phillip was able to earn a military education in Epaminondas's successful unconventional (at the time) styles of warfare. In 364 B.C., Phillip returned to Macedon. Thereafter he would utilize his military skills to dominate Greece.
