= Delos (mountain) =

Mountain in Boeotia, Greece

Delos or Delos Mountain was the ancient name of a mountain located in Boeotia, Greece, above the city of Tegyra. The mountain was sacred to Apollo, to whom temples on its slopes were dedicated.

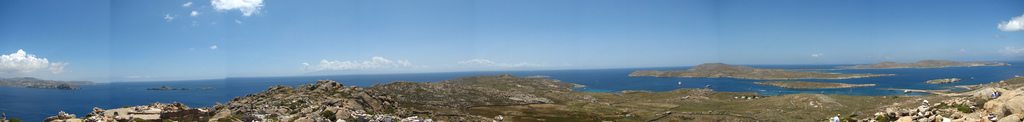
