= Delo =

Delo may refer to:

== People ==
- Ben Delo (born 1984), British entrepreneur
- Đelo Jusić (1939–2019), Croatian musician
- Ken Delo (1938–2016), American singer
- Paul K. Delo, involved in the Schlup v. Delo United States Supreme Court case

== Publications ==
- DELO, Russian Ukrainian newspaper
- Delo (newspaper), a Slovenian newspaper
- Delo (magazine), a Russian magazine

== Other ==
- Delo, a brand of motor oil and lubricants by Chevron Corporation
- DELO Industrial Adhesives, a German chemical company
- Delo language, also known as Ntribu, Gur language spoken in Ghana and Togo
- Delo, a sub-tribe of the Bilbas tribe in Kurdistan
