= Battle of Leuctra =

Thebes' victory against Sparta in 371 BC

- Part of the post–Peloponnesian War conflicts and the Theban–Spartan War
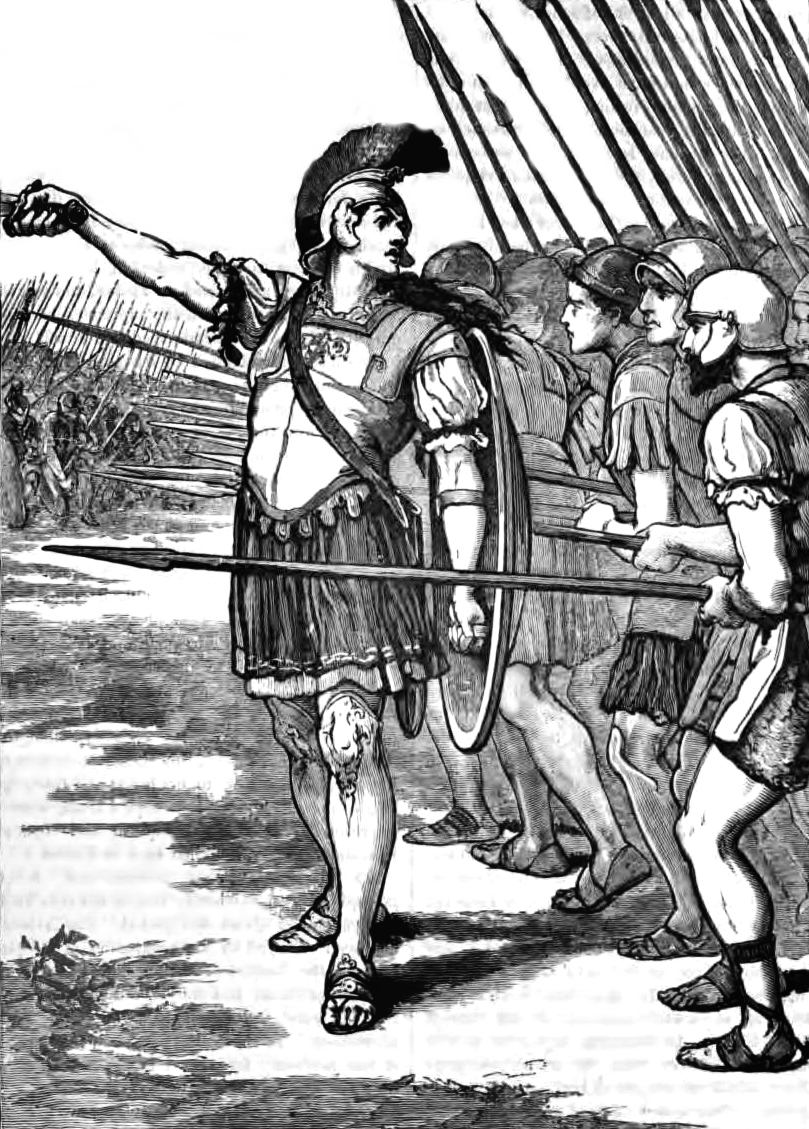
- Pelopidas leading the Thebans at the battle of Leuctra, 1882 illustration.
Date	6 July 371 BC
Location	Boeotia 38°15′53″N 23°10′27″E
Result	Theban victory: Beginning of the Theban hegemony

Belligerents
Thebes; Boeotian League	Sparta; Peloponnesian allies

Commanders and leaders
Epaminondas; Pelopidas	Cleombrotus I †

Strength
7,000 hoplites 700 cavalry	10,000 hoplites 1,000 cavalry

Casualties and losses
47–300	1,000–4,000+
- Location of the Battle of Leuctra

The Battle of Leuctra (Ancient Greek: Λεῦκτρα, Ancient Greek: [lêu̯k.tra]) was fought on 6 July 371 BC between the Boeotians led by the Thebans, and the Spartans along with their allies. The battle occurred in the context of the King's Peace, or Peace of Antalcidas, which had ended the Corinthian War in 386 BC. The Peace was formally renewed in 375 BC, but a disagreement between the Spartans and the Thebans over the protocol for renewing the Peace again in 371 led directly to the battle, which took place in the vicinity of Leuctra, a village in Boeotia in the territory of Thespiae. The mainly Theban victory shattered Sparta's immense influence over the Greek peninsula, and the wider Aegean Greek world, which Sparta had gained with its victory in the Peloponnesian War a generation earlier.

== Prelude ==
The Corinthian War, fought from 395 BC between Sparta and a Persian-backed coalition of Thebes, Athens, Corinth, Argos and other Greek allies, had ended in 387/6 BC with the King's Peace (also called the Peace of Antalcidas, or the first Common Peace), under the terms of which the autonomy of all Greek cities not under Persian control was guaranteed. Sparta, as the guarantor of the King's Peace in Greece, immediately used this autonomy clause to force the Thebes-dominated Boeotian League to disband. In 382 BC, the Spartan general Phoebidas seized Thebes' acropolis, the Cadmea, thereby assisting the pro-Spartan Leontiades and his oligarchic supporters in taking control of Thebes, a clear violation of Theban autonomy.

In late 379 BC, an anti-Spartan Theban exile faction overthrew Leontiades, and immediately signaled their intent to reconstitute the Boeotian League by electing four of the leaders of their revolt as Boeotarchs, the traditional title of the leaders of the Boeotian League. This resulted in the Boeotian War starting in 378 BC, and Sparta's succession of failed attempts to regain control of Thebes and Boeotia.

A short lived peace, was agreed to again in 375 BC, with renewed aggression by Thebes in 373 BC. Throughout the Boeotian War, Thebes had continued to expand its dominance over Boeotia. It captured and severely damaged the Boeotian towns of both Plataea, long an ally of Athens, and Thespiae, and forced their citizens into exile. By 371 BC, having engaged in costly naval campaigns, both Sparta and Thebes' ally Athens were ready for peace. Thebes, faced with the prospect of fighting Sparta alone, was likewise prepared to agree to a new peace treaty, which, like those of 386 and 375, promised the independence of all Greek cities. When it came time to sign the new treaty, the Theban ambassadors came forward wishing to sign on behalf of the whole Boeotian League, but the Spartans demanded instead that each Boeotian city sign independently, which the Thebans refused.

With Thebes now isolated, Sparta saw an opportunity to reassert its supremacy in central Greece, and the Spartans immediately sent king Cleombrotus I marching, from his position in Phocis in central Greece, into Boeotia. Rather than take the expected and easier route into Boeotia along the northern side of Mount Helicon, the Spartans and allies instead marched over the hills to the south of Helicon, and then proceeded to Leuctra, where they were confronted by a hastily repositioned Boeotian army.

== Force sizes and commanders ==
Several ancient sources give numbers for the sizes of the two armies, but none of these sources gives all the numbers involved, and they nearly all disagree. The general modern consensus is that the Spartan commander King Cleombrotus led approximately 10,000 Peloponnesian infantry, including 700 Spartiates (i.e. full Spartan citizens), and 1,000 cavalry, against 7,000 Boeotian infantry, and 700 cavalry, led overall by the Theban commander Epaminondas, with Pelopidas in command of the elite 300-strong Sacred Band.

According to Xenophon, 700 Spartiates fought at Leuctra, while according to Plutarch, Cleombrotus' Peloponnesian army consisted of 2,000 infantry and 1,000 cavalry. Diodorus Siculus reports that Epaminondas led a force (which included all Thebans of military age) numbering no more than 6,000, to be joined later by a Thessalian force of 1,500 infantry and 500 cavalry. Other, even later sources give much higher numbers for the Peloponnesians, which are harder to believe. According to Polyaenus, the Peloponnesians numbered 40,000 (against only 6,000 "Thebans"), while Frontinus specifies 24,000 infantry and 1,600 cavalry (against only 3,600 infantry and 400 cavalry). In any case, the similar force ratios (~ 6.5 to 1), given by Polyaenus and Frontinus, are perhaps meant simply to emphasize the difference in the sizes of the two armies.

== Order of battle ==
The red blocks show the placement of the elite troops within each phalanx. Top: Traditional hoplite order of battle and advance. Bottom: At Leuctra, Epaminondas placed his elite troops on the left facing the Spartans, with the strong left wing advancing more than the weaker right.

The normal practice of the ancient Greeks was to establish their heavily armed infantry in a solid rectangular mass, or phalanx, composed of long files, several ranks deep. The number of ranks varied, with eight thought to be a common phalanx depth, though other depths are documented. In order to counter the tendency of the phalanx to drift to the right, Greek commanders traditionally placed their most experienced and highly regarded troops on the right wing, with the entire phalanx usually advancing together.

At Leuctra, Cleombrotus' phalanx consisted of two wings (according to Xenophon "not more than twelve men deep"), with the Spartans on the right, and his allied troops on the left. Cleombrotus himself occupied the traditional king's position between the first and second morai (divisions) of the Spartan wing, accompanied by the Spartan hippeis (an elite infantry force of 300 young men probably in their twenties that constituted the royal bodyguard).

Epaminondas also organized his phalanx into two wings, the Thebans comprising one wing, and the rest of the Boeotians the other. However, in a break from tradition, Epaminondas massed his Theban infantry in a very deep column (according to Xenophon, at least fifty shields deep), placing it on the left, directly opposite Cleombrotus and the Spartan right. The other Boeotians were drawn up in a shallower line, progressively further to the right and rear of the proceeding column, in an echelon formation, facing the Spartan allies. Although the Sacred Band would play a crucial role in the battle, no source reports where (exactly) it was positioned. While not mentioning Leuctra specifically, Plutarch does say that, after the Battle of Tegyra (375 BC), where the Sacred Band had:

fought by themselves and about his own person, [Pleopidas] never afterwards divided or scattered them, but, treating them as a unit, put them into the forefront of the greatest conflicts.

This has been interpreted to mean that at Leuctra the Sacred Band was deployed as an independent unit somewhere in front. Epaminondas's plan was, apparently, to make the outcome depend solely upon an engagement of the Thebans against the Spartans, by sending his Thebans forward, against the Spartans, and refusing (i.e. holding back) his Boeotian allies. Polyaenus reports that, while rallying his Theban troops:

Epaminondas grasped a large snake, showed it to them, and in front of everyone crushed the animal's head. "You see," he said, "that the rest of the body is useless without the head. In just this way, should we crush this Laconian part, the remaining body of the allies would be useless."

== The battle ==
Accounts of the battle are given by four ancient sources: Xenophon (the only contemporary source), Diodorus Siculus (later first century BC), Plutarch (c. 100 AD), and Pausanias (late second century). The sources are problematic, their accounts are sometimes contradictory, and many particulars of the battle have been the subject of debate among scholars.

=== Overview ===
During the battle the massed Theban infantry, with the Sacred Band in front, smashed into the Spartan right wing. They were able to mortally wound the Spartan king Cleombrotus, killing also many of the Spartan hippeis. The Spartan wing was eventually pushed back, then turned, was routed, and fled. According to Xenophon, the "Lacedaemonians" (i.e the Spartans plus the Perioeci) themselves lost almost 1,000 dead, including about 400 of the 700 Spartiates present. The Boeotian losses were minimal, "about" 300, according to Diodorus Siculus, while Pausanias reports a total of only 47.

=== Details ===
Many more details of the battle (sometimes contradictory) are given by the ancient sources. Xenophon's account is the only contemporaneous one, is the most complete, and includes several details not found in any other source. However, rather than being a simple narrative describing what happened, Xenophon's account consists of various reasons (some might say excuses) for the surprising Spartan defeat. Referring to an oracle received by the Thebans saying that the Spartans were destined to be defeated, and other omens portending a Theban victory, the pious Xenophon begins his account of the battle by saying:

Some, to be sure, say that all these things were but devices of the leaders. But in the battle, at any rate, everything turned out adversely for the Lacedaemonians, while for the other side everything went prosperously, even to the gifts of fortune.

According to Xenophon, while both sides were still arming themselves, the Spartans' mercenary peltasts (slingers, javelineers, and/or light-armed skirmishers) attacked the Boeotian camp followers, baggage handlers, and others who did not wish to fight, as they were attempting to withdraw. This caused these men to flee back into the Boeotian army, inadvertently making it stronger. The battle proper then opened with a cavalry engagement, in which the Spartan cavalry was quickly defeated. Xenophon explains this defeat by saying that, as a result of their recent battles against Orchomenus and Thespiae, the Theban cavalry was more experienced, and that, because the Spartan cavalry was made up of men who did not own their horses and arms, and were the least physically able and ambitious, it was of inferior quality. In any case, the Spartan cavalry fled from the field, back through their own infantry, causing a disruption in the Spartan lines. Moreover, this occurred just as the Thebans were charging into them.

At this point Xenophon concludes his account of the action by saying that the Spartan line was able to hold long enough for the mortally wounded Cleombrotus to be carried off the field still alive, but eventually "fell back under the pressure of the Theban mass, while those who were on the left wing of the Lacedaemonians, when they saw that the right wing was being pushed back, gave way." No other sources mention an attack on the withdrawing Boeotians by the Spartans' mercenary peltasts, or give any hint at all of a cavalry engagement. However, Pausanias does say that Epaminondas, suspecting that some of his Boeotian allies, particularly the Thespians, might desert during the battle, declared that all who did not wish to fight could leave, and all the Thespians, and some of the other non-Theban Boeotians did so.

Xenophon makes no mention of Epaminondas, nor says anything about Theban strategies or tactics during the battle, but other sources do. According to Diodorus Siculus, Epaminondas had employed "an unusual disposition of his own", which consisted of an elite wing, where he would be, "intending to fight to the finish with them himself", and ordered his other wing, which he had arranged in "oblique formation", to avoid battle by a gradual withdrawal as they were attacked, hoping to decide the issue by means of his elite wing alone. Diodorus says that then, as the trumpets sounded the charge, both sides attacked simultaneously, with the Spartans attacking in a "crescent formation" (i.e. their left and right advancing faster than their center), and the elite Boeotian wing advancing "double-quick time", while its weaker wing retreated. According to Diodorus, although the Thebans had the advantage in the "valor and the denseness" of their elite line, and many Peloponnesians began to fall (though none had as yet turned to flee), the battle was nevertheless at first evenly fought. But after an "heroic" effort while "sustaining many wounds" Cleombrotus finally fell, and although the Spartans "fighting gallantly about their king" were able to recover his body, they were unable to hold off the "heavy column led by Epaminondas", who were greatly inspired by his "valour and exhortations", and were "with great difficulty" forced back, while still holding formation, but finally "turned and fled in utter rout". Diodorus goes on to describe Leuctra as "a most glorious victory", won "miraculously" by Thebes against the "invincible leaders of Greece".

Like Diodorus, Boeotian biographer Plutarch reports that Epaminondas's plan was to push back Cleombrotus, by a "fierce charge in column" with his all-Theban left wing, and thus he began moving his phalanx "obliquely to the left", so that, according to Plutarch, the Spartan left would be as far as possible from the Boeotian right. Like Xenophon, Plutarch has the Thebans attack a disordered Spartan line, but gives an entirely different reason for the lack of order. According to Plutarch, when Cleombrotus saw how Epaminondas was deploying his forces, they began to change their formation: "they were opening up their right wing and making an encircling movement, in order to surround Epaminondas and envelop him with their numbers." And it was at this point that Pelopidas, with his "band of three hundred on the run", charged into the Spartan line "before Cleombrotus had either extended his wing or brought it back again into its old position and closed up his line of battle, so that the Lacedaemonians were not standing in array, but moving confusedly about among each other when his onset reached them." Plutarch concludes his account by saying that, although the Spartan soldiers were accustomed to such situations, and were able to fight alongside whosoever they might find next to them:

the phalanx of Epaminondas bore down upon them alone and neglected the rest of their force, and since Pelopidas engaged them with incredible speed and boldness, their courage and skill were so confounded that there was a flight and slaughter of the Spartans such as had never before been seen.

Pausanias begins his brief account of the battle proper by saying that the Spartan allies, "who had hitherto been not the best of friends, now showed most clearly their hostility, by their reluctance to stand their ground, and by giving way wherever the enemy attacked them", and that, leaving aside their respective allies, the Spartans and Thebans were "not badly matched". However, when Cleombrotus fell, according to Pausanias, since it was the "greatest disgrace" to allow a Spartan king's body to fall into enemy hands, the Spartans were "bound by necessity" and could not retreat. Pausanias concludes by declaring:

The victory of Thebes was the most famous ever won by Greeks over Greeks.

=== Pelopidas and the Sacred Band ===
The conjectured flank attack by Pelopidas, proposed by Hermann Köchly and Wilhelm Rüstow, and rejected by Hans Delbrück.

Pelopidas and the Sacred Band played a significant role in the Theban victory at Leuctra. According to the first-century BC Roman biographer Cornelius Nepos, "in the battle of Leuctra, although Epaminondas was commander-in-chief, Pelopidas was the leader of the select corps that was first to break the Lacedaemonian phalanx." Plutarch, the only other source for this, describes Pelopidas and the Sacred Band as crucially catching the Spartans in disorder. According to Plutarch, while Cleombrotus was extending his right wing in order to effect an encircling movement:

Pelopidas darted forth from his position, and with his band of three hundred on the run, came up before Cleombrotus had either extended his wing or brought it back again into its old position and closed up his line of battle, so that the Lacedaemonians were not standing in array, but moving confusedly about among each other when his onset reached them.

That the Thebans attacked while the Spartan lines were disrupted is in accord with Xenophon's account, although Xenophon attributes the cause of the disruption to the defeated Spartan cavalry fleeing back through their own infantry. Hermann Köchly and Wilhelm Rüstow, writing in 1852, believed that Pelopidas led the Sacred Band out from the rear of the Theban column to attack the Spartan right wing in the flank, a view generally accepted until disputed, in 1920, by Hans Delbrück: "nothing whatever is to be found in Plutarch about a breaking-out from the column by Pleopidas, much less about a breaking out toward the flank or an attack on the Spartan's flank." Delbrück's rejection of a flank attack led by Pelopidas has found near-universal agreement among modern scholars.

== Immediate aftermath ==
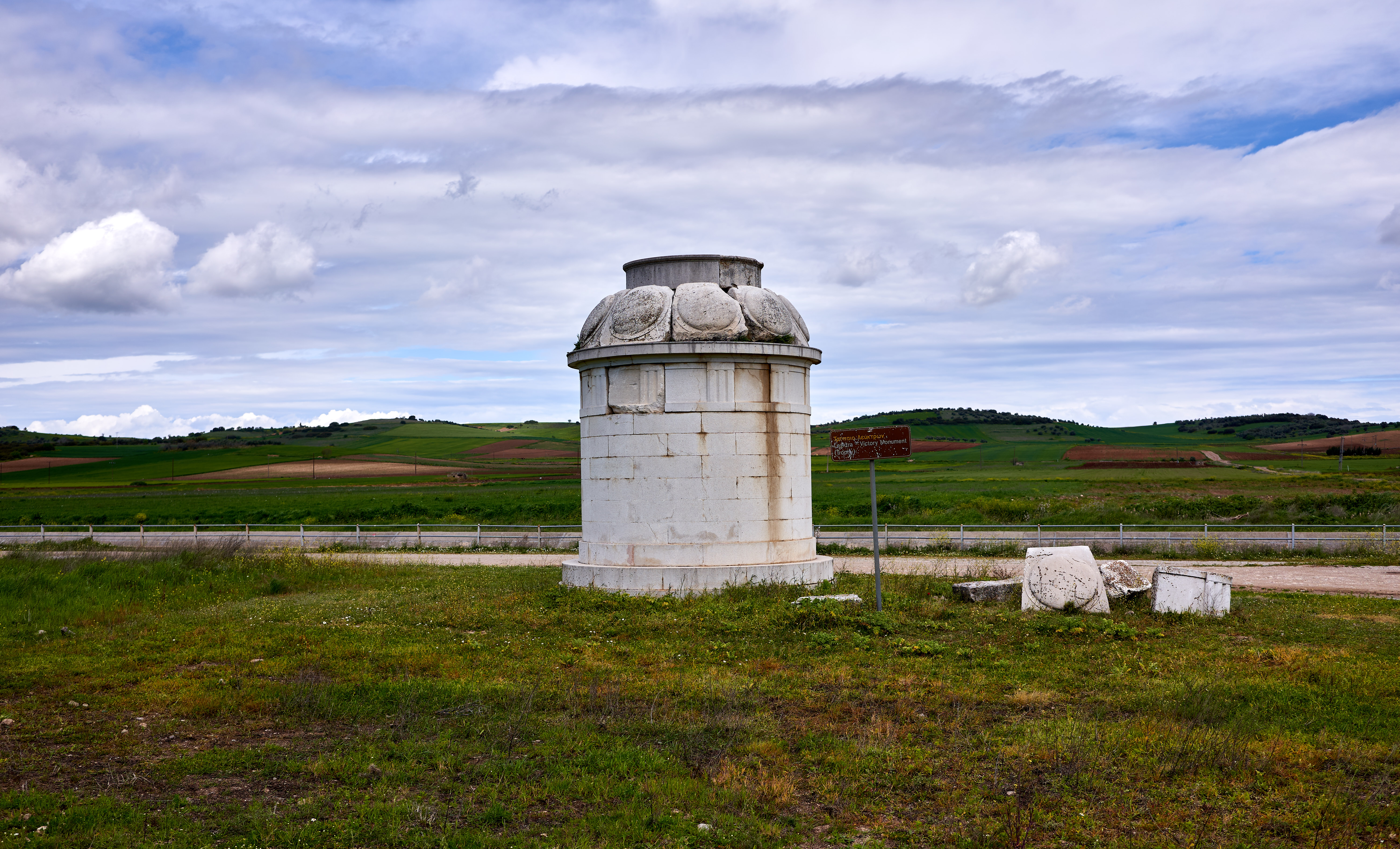
The restored surviving base of the permanent stone tropaion on the battlefield at Leuctra, which replaced the original tropaion set up immediately following the battle.

Immediately following the battle both sides sent messengers asking for reinforcements. Meanwhile, a truce was agreed to allow both armies to collect their dead, the Thebans set up a tropaion, and the two armies held their positions for several days.

According to Xenophon, when the Spartan messenger reached Sparta, all men under sixty years of age were mobilized and sent to Leuctra under the command of Archidamus, son of king Agesilaus II, and, although the Athenians dismissed the Theban messenger unanswered, Thebes' ally, Jason of Pherae in Thessaly, immediately led an army marching south. After his arrival, the Thebans proposed a joint attack on the Spartan position, but Jason convinced them to be content with their present victory, and to allow the Spartans to withdraw under truce.

== Historical significance ==
=== Political ===
More than a quarter of Sparta's population of full citizens had been lost at Leuctra. According to Aristotle, compounding an already chronically depleted Spartiate citizen body, the battle was the "single blow" that ended Sparta's dominance in ancient Greece. The loss not only affected Sparta's material strength but also shattered her perceived aura of invincibility. Sparta had tried to cover up previous battlefield losses, but at Leuctra the size of the defeat was apparent for all to see.

For nearly two centuries Sparta had been a Greek superpower. In 404 BC, following her Persian-aided victory over Athens in the Peloponnesian War, Sparta had become the hegemon, the undisputed leader of the Greek world. After Leuctra, Sparta's broken hegemony resulted in a reordering of power in Greece. In the Peloponnese, democratic factions, in city states long dominated by Sparta, experienced a resurgence of power, leading to widespread civil strife, local power struggles, shifting alliances and civil war. Less than a decade after Leuctra, Sparta had lost her Peloponnesian League alliance, and half her territory, having been "reduced to the status of a mere Peloponnesian squabbler".

Thebes was the principal beneficiary of the new order. The period 371–362 BC is widely known as the "Theban hegemony". However, Thebes' ascendancy was both volatile and short. Immediately following Leuctra, Thebes was able to consolidate and extend its power in Central Greece, including Orchomenus (restored to Boeotia), Phokis, Lokris, Akarnania, Malis, Trachis, Euboia, Aetolia, and Thessaly. In 370 BC, Thebes was presented with an opportunity, which she took, to ally with three Peloponnesian city-states: Elis, Argos, and the recently formed Arcadian League, which had seceded from Sparta's Peloponnesian League, and were seeking Theban protection from Sparta. This was followed, in the winter of 370/69 BC, by a Theban-led invasion of Laconia and Messenia—the first invasion of the Spartan homeland by land in recorded history, which succeeded in the liberation of the Perioeci of Messenia and its helot population from Spartan enslavement.

A second Theban-led invasion of northern Peloponnese, in the summer of 369 BC, succeeded in seizing control, away from Sparta, of Sikyon and Achaean Pellene, a third invasion, in 366 BC, left Thebes in control of all of Achaea, while a fourth invasion culminated in a Theban victory at the Second Battle of Mantinea, in 362 BC. However, that battle, which resulted in the death of Epaminondas, would also mark the end of the Theban hegemony. Less than thirty years later, Thebes would suffer utter destruction, at the hands of Alexander the Great.

=== Military ===
Battles in Ancient Greece

The Theban victory at the Battle of Leuctra is commonly attributed to several innovations in military tactics employed by Epaminondas. Features of the Battle of Leuctra which have been considered to be innovative are: the concentration of the elite forces on the Boeotian left flank, an oblique attack, a refused right wing, forces held in reserve, and the integrated use of cavalry and infantry. While it is debatable just how revolutionary such tactics actually were, Epaminondas' tactics at Leuctra, are commonly thought to have directly influenced the battle tactics used by Philip II of Macedon, who had studied and lived in Thebes as a hostage between 368 and 365 BC.
