= Battle of Tegyra =

375 BCE battle between Thebes and Sparta

Date	375 BC
Location	Tegyra, near Orchomenus, Boeotia 38°32′03″N 22°57′28″E
Result	Theban victory

Belligerents
Thebes	Sparta

Commanders and leaders
Pelopidas	Gorgoleon †, Theopompus †

Strength
300 infantry, 200 cavalry	1,000–1,800

Casualties and losses
Low	Moderate
- First recorded occasion on which a Spartan hoplite force was defeated by a numerically inferior force in a set battle.
- Location of the Battle of Tegyra

The Battle of Tegyra (375 BC) (also known as the Battle of Tegyrae) was an ancient Greek battle between Theban and Spartan hoplite forces. In the battle, a Theban army under Pelopidas was challenged by a substantially larger Spartan force while retreating from an abortive attack on Orchomenus, but successfully attacked and routed the Spartans. The battle marked the first occasion in the historical record in which a Spartan force had been defeated by a numerically inferior enemy in a set battle (as opposed to irregular warfare, employed by Iphicrates).

== Prelude ==
After an insurrection in 379/8 BC removed Spartan control over Thebes, the city set about reestablishing its control over the Boeotian League. Over several years of campaigning, the Thebans succeeded in driving Spartan garrisons out of every city in Boeotia but Orchomenus. In 376 BC, Pelopidas, learning that the Spartan garrison of Orchomenus had gone on an expedition to Locris, set out with the Sacred Band of Thebes and a small force of cavalry, intending to seize the city while it was unguarded. As the Thebans approached the city, however, they learned that a sizable force had been dispatched from Sparta to reinforce the Orchomenus' garrison, and was approaching the city. Accordingly, Pelopidas retreated with his force, but before the Thebans could reach safety at Tegyra, they met the original Spartan garrison returning from Locris.

== Battle ==
Map of ancient Boeotia showing the location of the city of Orchomenus

The Theban force was heavily outnumbered by the Spartans opposite them. The Sacred Band numbered some 300 hoplites, while the Spartan garrison consisted of two companies (mori), meaning that the Spartan force contained between 1,000 and 1,800 hoplites. Plutarch reports that one Theban soldier, upon seeing the enemy force, said to Pelopidas "We are fallen into our enemies' hands," to which Pelopidas replied "And why not they into ours?" Pelopidas then ordered the Theban cavalry to charge while the infantry formed up into an abnormally dense formation. When the two phalanxes came together, the compact Theban formation broke through the Spartan line at the point of contact, then turned to attack the vulnerable flanks of the Spartans to either side. The Spartan force broke and fled, although the Theban pursuit was limited by the proximity of Orchomenus.

== Significance ==
The Theban victory at Tegyra had little immediate military significance, beyond the survival of Pelopidas's force; the Spartan force, once regrouped within Orchomenus, was far too formidable for Pelopidas to press his advantage. Despite this fact, the victory was a symbolically significant event for both sides. Diodorus Siculus records that the victory at Tegyra marked the first time the Thebans had erected a trophy of victory over a Spartan force—for while the Thebans had defeated the Spartans before, these victories had generally been in much smaller skirmishes. For the Spartans, on the other hand, their defeat at Tegyra marked the first occasion on which one of their formations had been defeated by a force of equal or lesser size in set battle. For these reasons, Plutarch saw in Pelopidas' victory at Tegyra a "prelude to Leuctra", with the limited victory in 375 anticipating the day 4 years later when a similarly outnumbered Theban phalanx would deal Sparta a blow from which it would never recover.
