= Hermann Köchly =

German philologist and educational reformer (1815–1876)

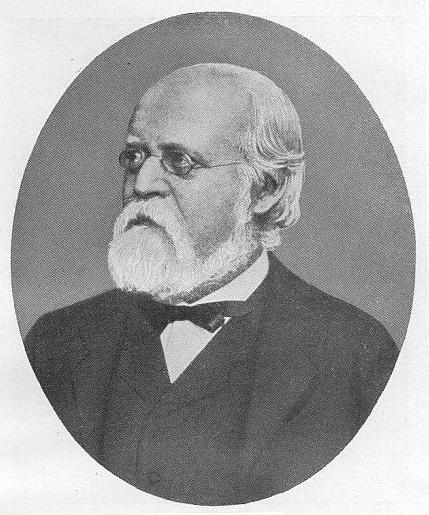
Hermann Köchly

Hermann August Theodor Köchly (5 August 1815 in Leipzig – 3 December 1876 in Trieste) was a German philologist and educational reformer.

== Biography ==
He studied at Leipzig, taught at the Saalfeld Progymnasium (1837) and at the Dresden Kreuzschule (1840). In February 1849, Köchly was elected to the lower house of the Kingdom of Saxony, but that same year was forced to flee to Brussels on account of his participation in the May insurrection. He was appointed professor of classical philology at Zürich in 1851, and at Heidelberg in 1864. He was a member of the Reichstag from 1871 to 1873 and attached himself to the Progressive Party.

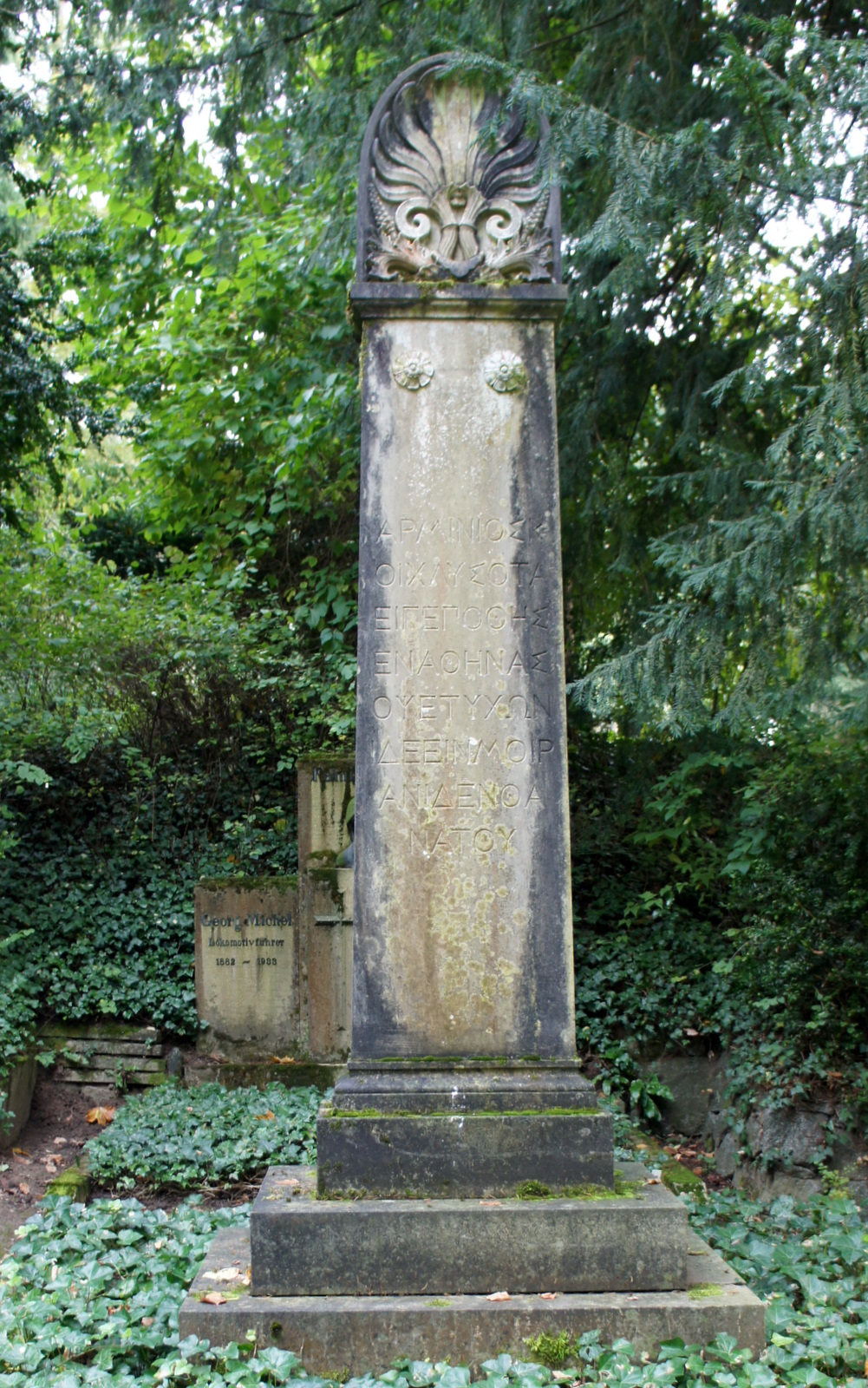
Köchly's grave in Heidelberg

== Works ==
=== Educational reform ===
- Ueber das Princip des Gymnasialunterrichts der Gegenwart (Principals for gymnasial instruction for modern times, 1845)
- Zur Gymnasialreform (Reforming gymnasiums, 1846)

The scheme set forth in these pamphlets stressed the natural sciences, and, in Latin and Greek, urged emphasis on content rather than on grammar and style, and the gradual abolition of speaking and writing those languages. The plan was adopted in Saxony almost immediately.

=== Grecian epics ===
- Critical essays on Quintus Smyrnæus (Leipzig, 1830)
- Hesiod, in collaboration with Gottfried Kinkel (1870)
- An edition of Aratus, Manethonis, Maximi et aliorum astrologica (Paris, 1851)
- An edition of the text of Apostelesmata (Leipzig, 1858)
- Dionysiaca of Nonnos (Leipzig, 1858)
- Seven dissertations on De Iliadis carminibus (Zürich, 1850–59)
- De diversis Hesiodeæ Theogoniæ partibus (Zürich, 1860)
- Iliadis Carmina XVI (1861)
- Three dissertations on De Odysseæ carminibus (Zürich, 1862–63)
- Opuscula epica IV (Zürich, 1864).

=== Ancient military subjects ===
- Geschichte des Griechischen Kriegswesens von der ältesten Zeit bis auf Pyrrhos (Aarau, 1852)
- Griechische Kriegsschriftsteller (Leipzig, 1853–55), vol. 1, vol. 2 part 1, vol. 2 part 2.
- Einleitung in Cäsars Kommentarien über den gallischen Krieg (Gotha, 1857)
- Onosandri de imperatoris officio Liber (Leipzig, 1860)

=== Others' works ===
- An edition of Arrian's Anabasis (1861)
- Editions of Euripides and Iphigenia in Taurien (1863)
- An edition of Medea (1867)

He did translations, especially of Caesar, Aeschylus, etc. A collection of his smaller works is found in his Opuscula academica (Leipzig, 1853–56), Akademische Vorträge und Reden (Zürich, 1856) and Opuscula philologica (Leipzig 1881–82).
