= Pelopidas =

4th century BC Theban statesman and general

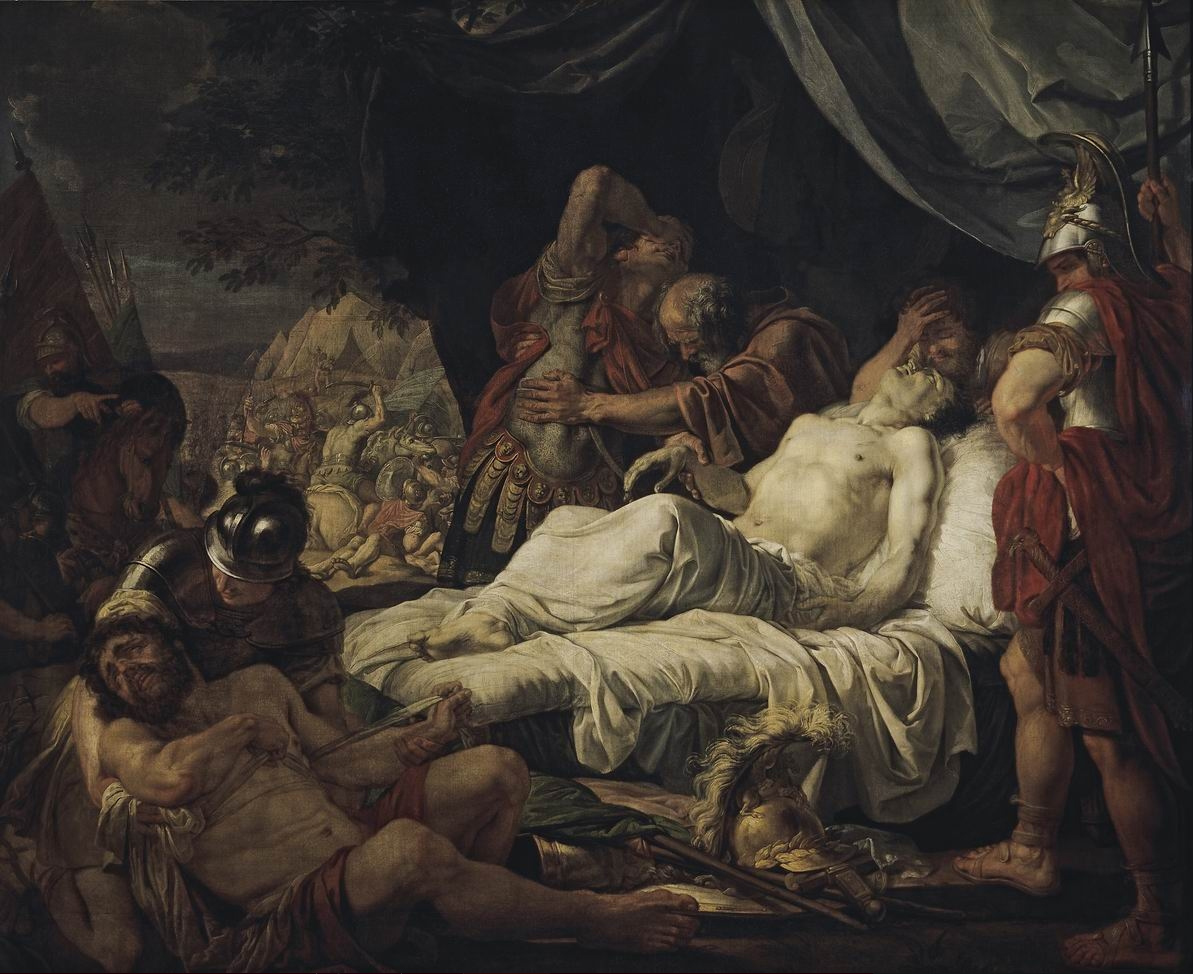
Death of Pelopidas, by Andrey Ivanov, 1805–1806

Pelopidas (/pəˈlɒpɪdəs/; Ancient Greek: Πελοπίδας; died 364 BC) was an important Theban statesman and general in Greece, instrumental in establishing the mid-fourth century Theban hegemony.

== Biography ==
=== Athlete and warrior ===
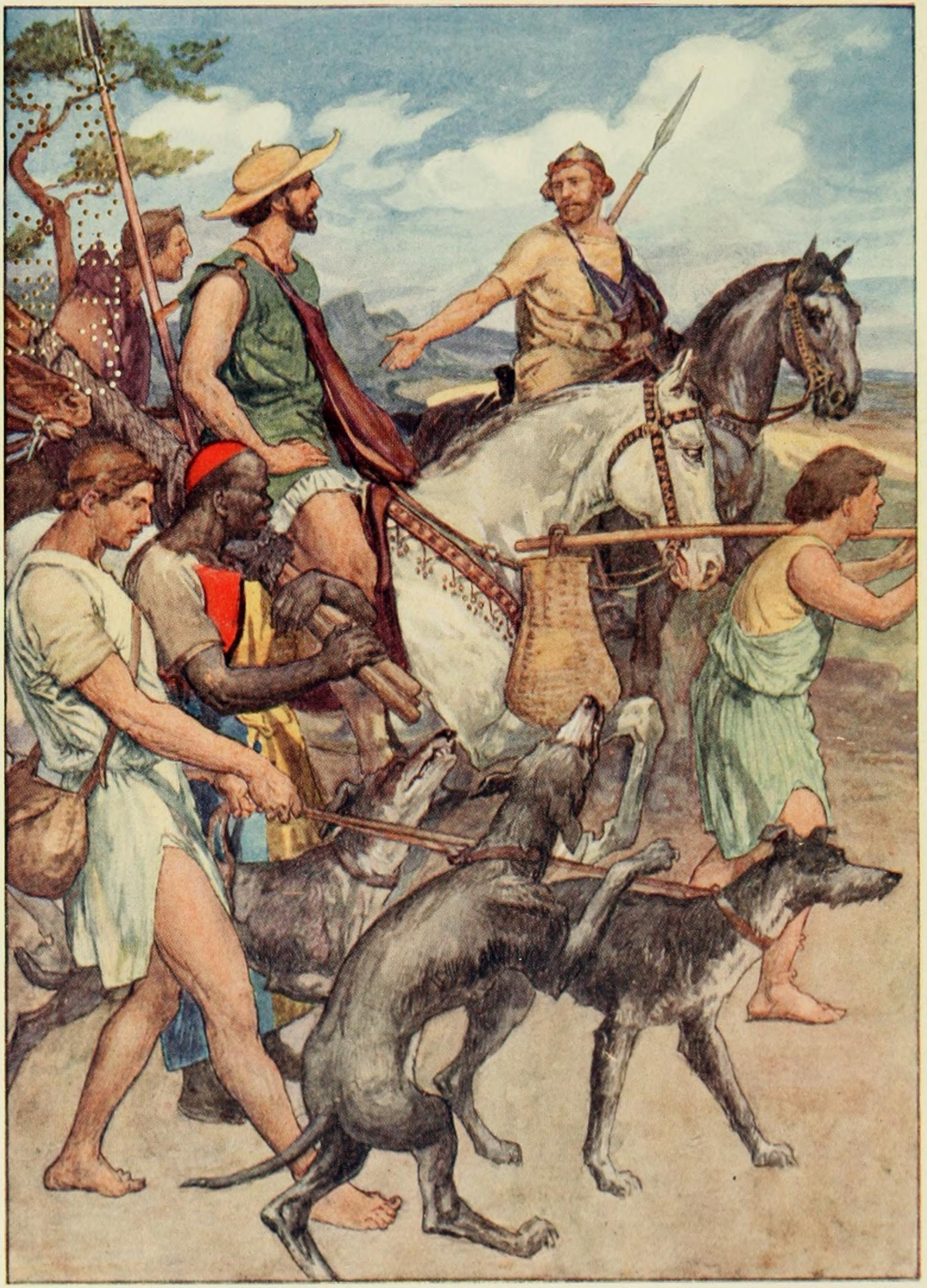
Pelopidas setting out for Thebes

Pelopidas was a member of a distinguished family and possessed great wealth, which he expended on his friends and on public service while he himself was content to lead the rough life of an athlete. In 384 BC, he served in a Theban contingent sent to the support of the Spartans during the Siege of Mantinea, where he was dangerously wounded by the Arcadians, but was saved by Epaminondas and Agesipolis.

Pelopidas, after receiving seven wounds in front, sank down upon a great heap of friends and enemies who lay dead together; but Epaminondas, although he thought him lifeless, stood forth to defend his body and his arms, and fought desperately, single-handed against many, determined to die rather than leave Pelopidas lying there. And now he too was in a sorry plight, having been wounded in the breast with a spear and in the arm with a sword, when Agesipolis the Spartan king came to his aid from the other wing, and when all hope was lost, saved them both.

Plutarch says that this incident firmly cemented their friendship, and Pelopidas would be Epaminondas's partner in politics for the next 20 years.

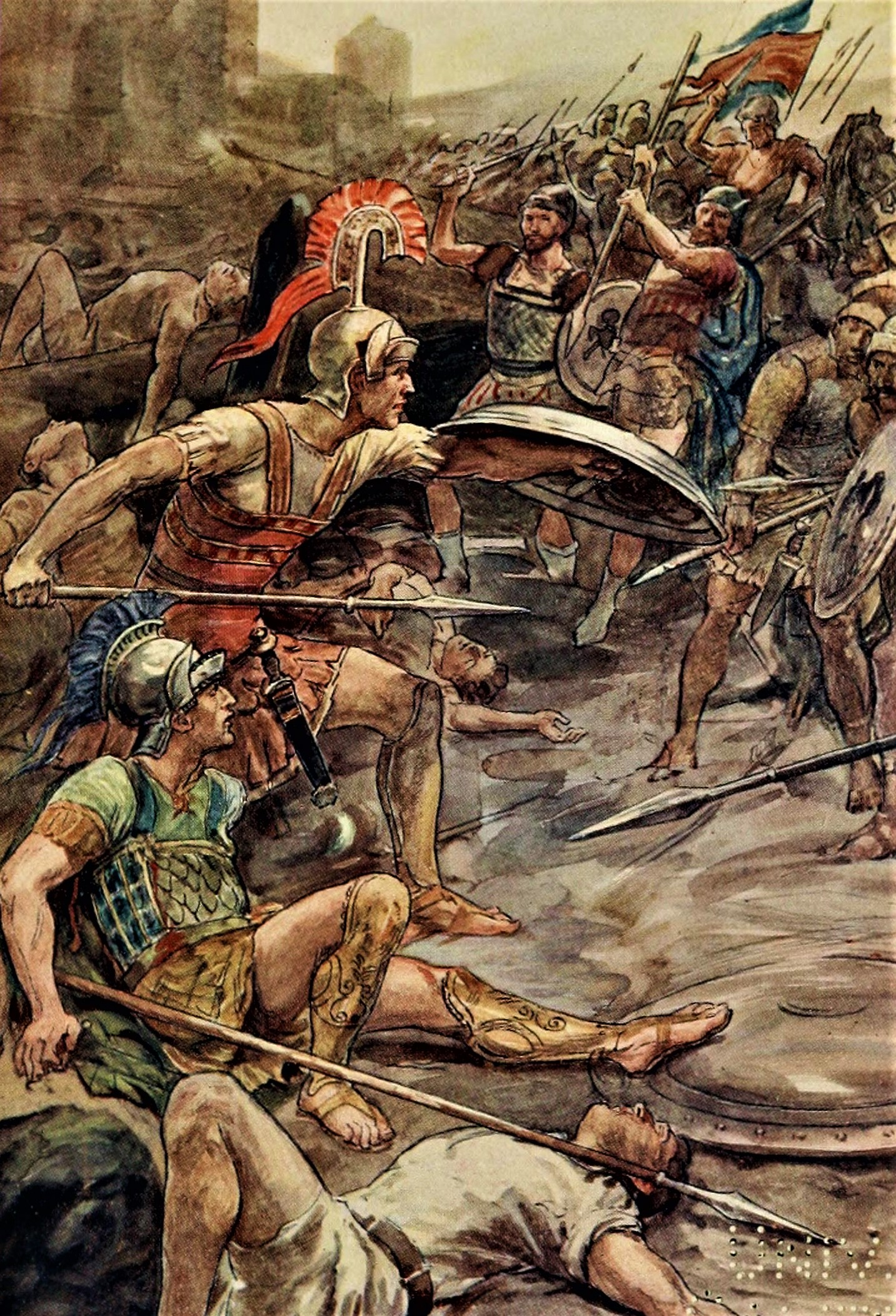
Epaminondas defending Pelopidas at the Siege of Mantinea (385 BC).

According to Plutarch's Life of Pelopidas (from Plutarch's Parallel Lives in which Pelopidas's life was paired with the life of Marcellus), he lessened his inherited estate by showing constant care for the deserving poor of Thebes, taking pleasure in simple clothing, a sparse diet, and the constant hardships of military life. People said that he was ashamed to spend more on himself than the lowest of the Thebans spent on himself. Once, when friends argued that he needed to care for his finances since he had a wife and children, and that money was a necessary thing, Pelopidas pointed to a blind, crippled pauper named Nicodemus and said, "Yes, necessary for Nicodemus."

Upon the seizure of the Theban citadel by the Spartans (382 BC), Pelopidas fled to Athens and took the lead in a conspiracy to liberate Thebes. The Spartans, though royalists in their own state, installed oligarchic governments in the city-states they conquered in pursuit of the Spartan hegemony. In 379 BC, Pelopidas' democratic faction rose in a surprise revolt and killed many of the corrupted Theban aristocrats supporting Spartan rule. The Spartan garrison surrendered to an army gathered by Pelopidas.

=== Boeotarch ===
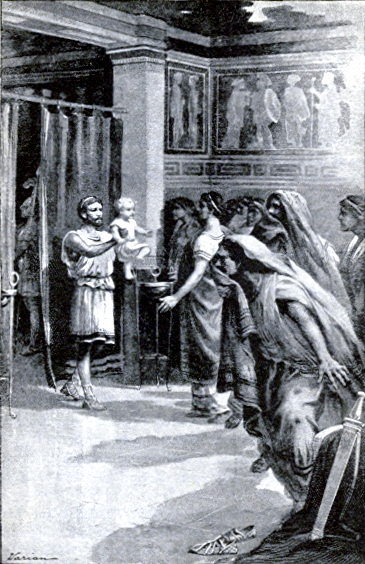
Charon placed his only son in the arms of Pelopidas

In this and 12 subsequent years, he was elected boeotarch, or warleader, and around 375 BC, he routed a much larger Spartan force at the Battle of Tegyra (near Orchomenus). This victory he owed mainly to the valour of the Sacred Band, an elite corps of 300 seasoned soldiers. At the Battle of Leuctra (371 BC), he contributed greatly to the success of Epaminondas's new tactics by the rapidity with which he made the Sacred Band close with the Spartans. At Leuctra, Epaminondas, a brilliant and intuitive general, used the oblique order for the first time. After the battle at Leuctra, Thebes began to replace Sparta as the leading city of Greece.

In 370 BC, he accompanied his close friend Epaminondas as boeotarch into the Peloponnese, where, by re-founding as an independent city Messene Sparta's former dependency, they were able to consolidate their success and permanently deprive Sparta of its hegemonic power. On their return, both generals were accused, unsuccessfully, of having retained their command beyond the legal term. In fact, the democrats and some aristocrats of Thebes acknowledged that Pelopidas and Epaminondas were the two most capable and important personalities of their city. Both were trying to establish a state that would unite Greece under the Theban hegemony – what Xenophon called a policy "continuously direct towards securing supremacy in Greece".

=== Embassy to Persia ===
In 367 BC, Pelopidas went on an embassy to the Persian king Artaxerxes II. Backed by the prestige of his Leuctra victory, Pelopidas was able to induce the king to prescribe a settlement of Greece according to the wishes of the Thebans, with particular reference to the continuing independence of Messene.

=== Thessalian campaign and death ===
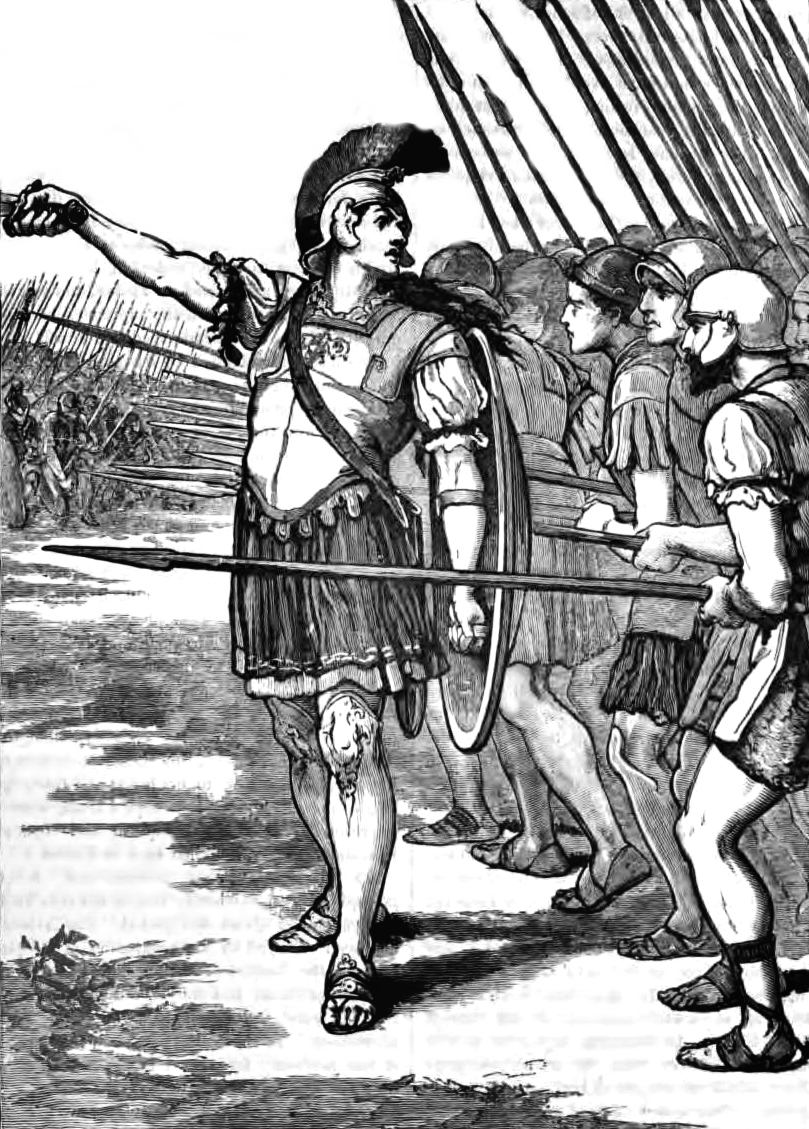
Pelopidas leading the Thebans at the Battle of Leuctra.

The 360s saw Pelopidas leading a military/diplomatic advance by Theban power into Central and Northern Greece. In 369 BC, in response to a petition of the Thessalians, Pelopidas was sent with an army against Alexander of Pherae. After driving Alexander out, he passed into Macedon and arbitrated between two claimants to the throne. In order to secure the influence of Thebes in Macedon, he brought home hostages, including the king's younger brother Philip, a young man who would one day become king himself. In Thebes, Philip learned about the military tactics and politics of the Greeks.

The next year, Pelopidas was again called upon to interfere in Macedonia, but being deserted by his mercenaries, was compelled to make an agreement with Ptolemy of Aloros. On his return through Thessaly, he was seized by Alexander of Pherae, and two expeditions (the second expedition, the successful one, was led by his friend Epaminondas) from Thebes were needed to secure his release.

In 364 BC, he received another appeal from the Thessalian towns against Alexander of Pherae. Although an eclipse of the sun prevented his bringing with him more than a handful of troops, he overthrew the tyrant's far superior force on the ridge of Cynoscephalae. However, wishing to slay Alexander with his own hand, he rushed forward too eagerly and was cut down by the tyrant's guards. Plutarch considered him a prime example of a leader who threw away his life through recklessness and anger.

== See also ==
- Diodorus Siculus
- Hegemony
- Helots
- Sacred Band of Thebes
