= Gryllus, son of Xenophon =

Greek soldier, son of Xenophon

Gryllus (Ancient Greek: Γρύλλος) was the elder son of Xenophon. When the war, which broke out between Elis and Arcadia in 365 BC, on the subject of the Triphylian towns, had rendered a residence at Scillus no longer safe, Gryllus and his brother Diodorus were sent by Xenophon to Lepreum for security. Here he himself soon after joined them, and went with them to Corinth.

Both young men served with the Athenian cavalry at the Battle of Mantinea, in 362 BC, where Gryllus was slain in the fighting. It was he, according to the account of the Athenians and Thebans, who gave Epaminondas his mortal wound, and he was represented in the act of inflicting it in a picture of the battle by Euphranor in the Cerameicus. The Mantineians also, though they ascribed the death of Epaminondas to a "Machaerion", yet honored Gryllus with a public funeral and an equestrian statue, and reverenced his memory, as the bravest of all who fought on their side at Mantineia. According to Diogenes Laërtius, he was celebrated after his death in numberless epigrams and panegyrics.
