= 370s BC =

Decade

This article concerns the period 379 BC – 370 BC.

== Events ==
=== 379 BC ===
==== By place ====
====== Greece ======
- Sparta suppresses the Chalcidian League and imposes terms favourable to King Amyntas III of Macedonia.
- A small group of Theban exiles, led by Pelopidas, infiltrate the city of Thebes and assassinates the leaders of the pro-Spartan government. Epaminondas and Gorgidas lead a group of young men who break into the city's armories, take weapons, and surround the Spartans on the Cadmea, assisted by a force of Athenian hoplites. In the Theban assembly the next day, Epaminondas and Gorgidas bring Pelopidas and his men before the audience and exhort the Thebans to fight for their freedom. The assembly responds by acclaiming Pelopidas and his men as liberators. Fearing for their lives, the Spartan garrison surrenders and are evacuated. The Thebans of the pro-Spartan party are also allowed to surrender; they are subsequently executed.
- The Thebans are able to reconstitute their old Boeotian confederacy in a new, democratic form. The cities of Boeotia unite as a federation with an executive body composed of seven generals, or Boeotarchs, elected from seven districts throughout Boeotia.

=== 378 BC ===
==== By place ====
====== Greece ======
- The Theban general and statesman, Epaminondas, takes command of Thebes. Pelopidas is elected boeotarch, or chief magistrate, of the city.
- Timotheus, the son of the Athenian general Conon, is elected strategos of Athens.
- A Spartan attempt to seize Piraeus brings Athens closer to Thebes. The Athenian mercenary commander Chabrias successfully faces off the larger army of Agesilaus II near Thebes. At the advance of Agesilaus' forces, instead of giving the order to charge, Chabrias famously orders his men at ease—with the spear remaining pointing upwards instead of towards the enemy, and the shield leaning against the left knee instead of being hoisted against the shoulder. The command is followed immediately and without question by the mercenaries under his command, to be copied by their counterparts beside them, the elite Sacred Band of Thebes under the command of Gorgidas. This "show of contempt" stops the advancing Spartan forces, and shortly afterwards Agesilaus withdraws.
- Athens allies itself with Thebes and forms the Second Athenian League. The confederacy includes most of the Boeotian cities and some of the Ionian islands.

====== Sicily ======
- Dionysius I's third war with Carthage proves disastrous. He suffers a crushing defeat at Cronium and is forced to pay an indemnity of 1,000 talents and cede the territory west of the Halycus River to the Carthaginians.

====== Roman Republic ======
- The Servian Wall is constructed around Rome to prevent the city from being captured or sacked (see 390 BC). This is the first fortification that the Romans build around their home city.

=== 377 BC ===
==== By place ====
====== Persian Empire ======
- Mausolus is appointed as the Persian satrap of Caria.

====== Greece ======
- Timotheus wins over the Acarnanians and Molossians as friends of Athens.
- Athens, in preparing for participation in the Spartan-Theban struggle, reorganises its finances and its taxation, inaugurating a system whereby the richer citizens are responsible for the collection of taxes from the less rich.
- The Peace of Antalcidas (387 BC), includes a clause guaranteeing the Greek cities their independence. The Spartan King Agesilaus II uses this clause as an excuse to force the dissolution of Thebes' Boeotian League. In two sieges, he reduces Thebes to near starvation.

=== 376 BC ===
==== By place ====
====== Greece ======
- The Athenian admiral Chabrias wins a naval victory for Athens over the Spartan fleet, off the island of Naxos (the Battle of Naxos). The battle is brought on by the Athenians to break the Spartans' blockade of Athens' corn-ships from the Black Sea.
- The Thracian city of Abdera is sacked by the Triballi.

=== 375 BC ===
==== By place ====
====== Greece ======
- The Theban general, Pelopidas, is made the leader of the Sacred Band, a selected infantry body of 300.
- Learning that the Spartan garrison of Orchomenus (in Boeotia) is leaving for an expedition to Locris, Pelopidas sets out with the Sacred Band of Thebes and a small force of cavalry, intending to seize the city while it is unguarded. However, as the Thebans approach the city, they learn that a sizable force has been dispatched from Sparta to reinforce the garrison at Orchomenus and is approaching the city. Pelopidas retreats with his force, but before the Thebans can reach safety at Tegyra, they meet the original Spartan garrison returning from Locris. In the ensuing Battle of Tegyra, the Thebans rout the larger Spartan force.

====== China ======
- Zhou Lie Wang becomes king of the Zhou dynasty of China.

=== 374 BC ===
==== By place ====
====== Greece ======
- Athens tries to retire from the Theban-Spartan war and makes peace with Sparta. However, the peace is quickly broken.
- Sparta attacks Corcyra, enlisting Syracusan help. Athens comes to the island's aid. The Athenian general, Timotheus, captures Corcyra and defeats the Spartans at sea off Alyzia (Acarnania).

====== Cyprus ======
- The King of Salamis, Evagoras, is assassinated. He is succeeded by his son, Nicocles, who continues his father's liberal Hellenising policy in Cyprus, encouraged by Isocrates, who writes his Exhortation to Nicocles.

=== 373 BC ===
==== By place ====
====== Persian Empire ======
- The Persian King Artaxerxes II launches an invasion of Egypt to bring that country back under Persian rule. The invasion is led by Pharnabazus. After initial successes, the Greek mercenaries fighting for the Persians push on towards Memphis. However, King Nectanebo I is able to gather his forces and repulse the Persian invasion.

====== Greece ======
- Iphicrates leads an Athenian expedition which successfully relieves Corcyra of a Spartan siege.
- The ancient Greek city of Helike is destroyed by a massive earthquake and tsunami.
- The Temple of Apollo in Delphi is destroyed by an earthquake.

=== 372 BC ===
==== By place ====
====== Greece ======
- Jason of Pherae, the ruler of Thessaly, allies himself first with Athens and then with Macedon.

==== By topic ====
====== Sports ======
- Troilus of Elis wins two equestrian events at the Olympic Games, which leads to referees being banned from competing in the Games.

=== 371 BC ===
==== By place ====
====== Greece ======
- A fresh peace congress is summoned at Sparta. At the peace conference, the Spartan King Agesilaus II (with the support of Athens) refuses to allow the Thebans to sign the treaty on behalf of all Boeotia. The Theban statesman Epaminondas, who is boeotarch (one of the five magistrates of the Boeotian federation), maintains Thebes' position, even when it leads to the exclusion of Thebes from the peace treaty.
- Thebes' actions at the peace congress lead to a war between Sparta and Thebes. The Spartans have an army stationed on Thebes' western frontier, waiting to follow up their diplomatic success by a crushing military attack. However, at the Battle of Leuctra, the Theban generals, Epaminondas and Pelopidas, win a decisive victory over the Spartans under the other Spartan king, Cleombrotus I (who is killed in the battle). Epaminondas wins the battle with a tactical innovation which involves striking the enemy first at their strongest, instead of their weakest, point, with such crushing force that the attack is irresistible. As a result of this battle, the Boeotian federation is saved.
- Athens does not welcome the Theban victory, fearing the rising aggressiveness of Thebes. After the Theban victory, the old alliance between the Persians and the Thebans is restored.
- With the unexpected defeat of Sparta by the Thebans, the Arcadians decide to re-assert their independence. They rebuild Mantinea, form an Arcadian League and build a new federal city, Megalopolis.
- Agesipolis II succeeds his father Cleombrotus I as king of Sparta.

==== By topic ====
====== Astronomy ======
- It is suggested that the original comet associated with the Kreutz Sungrazers family of comets passes perihelion at this time. It is thought to have been observed by Aristotle and Ephorus during this year.

=== 370 BC ===
==== By place ====
====== Greece ======
- The Spartans under King Agesilaus II invade Arcadia. After appealing in vain to the Athenians for help, Arcadia turns to the Thebans. Epaminondas of Thebes arrives with an army, finds that the Spartans have retired and follows them.
- With the support of Thebes, the Arcadian capital city of Megalopolis is completed and a democratic system is set up with an Assembly of Ten Thousand and a Council of fifty.
- The tagus of Thessaly, Jason of Pherae, dies, after making Thessaly a powerful force in Greek politics.

==== By topic ====
====== Art ======
- The sculptor Praxiteles begins his active career in Athens (approximate date).

====== Mathematics ======
- Eudoxus of Cnidus develops the method of exhaustion for mathematically determining the area under a curve.

== Births ==
376 BC

- Olympias, wife of king Philip II of Macedon and mother of Alexander the Great (d. 316 BC)

375 BC

- Cleitus the Black, Macedonian general of Alexander the Great (approximate date)
- Chanakya, ancient Indian teacher, author, strategist and royal advisor.

372 BC

- Mencius, Chinese philosopher (d. c. 289 BC)

371 BC

- Chanakya, Indian philosopher and advisor (approximate date)
- Theophrastus, Greek philosopher

370 BC

- Marcus Valerius Corvus, Roman hero (d. c. 270 BC)
- Theophrastus, Greek philosopher, a native of Eressos in Lesbos, the successor of Aristotle in the Peripatetic school (d. c. 285 BC) Chanakya

== Deaths ==
376 BC

- Zhou An Wang, king of the Chinese Zhou dynasty

375 BC

- Hippocrates, Greek physician (approximate year)

374 BC

- Evagoras, king of Salamis in Cyprus (assassinated)
- Marquess Ai of Han

371 BC

- Cleombrotus I, king of Sparta (killed in the Battle of Leuctra)

370 BC

- Agesipolis II, Agiad king of Sparta
- Democritus of Abdera, Greek philosopher (approximate date) (b. c. 460 BC)
- Hippocrates of Cos, Greek physician (b. c. 460 BC)
- Jason of Pherae, ruler of Thessaly
