= 379 BC =

379 BC in various calendars
Gregorian calendar	379 BC; CCCLXXIX BC
Ab urbe condita	375
Ancient Egypt era	XXX dynasty, 2
Pharaoh	Nectanebo I, 2
Ancient Greek Olympiad (summer)	100th Olympiad, year 2
Assyrian calendar	4372
Balinese saka calendar	N/A
Bengali calendar	−972 – −971
Berber calendar	572
Buddhist calendar	166
Burmese calendar	−1016
Byzantine calendar	5130–5131
Chinese calendar	辛丑年 (Metal Ox); 2319 or 2112 — to — 壬寅年 (Water Tiger); 2320 or 2113
Coptic calendar	−662 – −661
Discordian calendar	788
Ethiopian calendar	−386 – −385
Hebrew calendar	3382–3383
- Hindu calendars
Vikram Samvat	−322 – −321
Shaka Samvat	N/A
Kali Yuga	2722–2723
Holocene calendar	9622
Iranian calendar	1000 BP – 999 BP
Islamic calendar	1031 BH – 1030 BH
Javanese calendar	N/A
Julian calendar	N/A
Korean calendar	1955
Minguo calendar	2290 before ROC 民前2290年
Nanakshahi calendar	−1846
Thai solar calendar	164–165
Tibetan calendar	ལྕགས་མོ་གླང་ལོ་ (female Iron-Ox) −252 or −633 or −1405 — to — ཆུ་ཕོ་སྟག་ལོ་ (male Water-Tiger) −251 or −632 or −1404

Year 379 BC was a year of the pre-Julian Roman calendar. At the time, it was known as the Year of the Tribunate of Capitolinus, Vulso, Iullus, Sextilius, Albinius, Antistius, Trebonius and Erenucius (or, less frequently, year 375 Ab urbe condita). The denomination 379 BC for this year has been used since the early medieval period, when the Anno Domini calendar era became the prevalent method in Europe for naming years.

== Events ==
=== By place ===
==== Greece ====
- Sparta suppresses the Chalcidian League and imposes terms favourable to King Amyntas III of Macedonia.
- A small group of Theban exiles, led by Pelopidas, infiltrate the city of Thebes and assassinates the leaders of the pro-Spartan government. Epaminondas and Gorgidas lead a group of young men who break into the city's armories, take weapons, and surround the Spartans on the Cadmea, assisted by a force of Athenian hoplites. In the Theban assembly the next day, Epaminondas and Gorgidas bring Pelopidas and his men before the audience and exhort the Thebans to fight for their freedom. The assembly responds by acclaiming Pelopidas and his men as liberators. Fearing for their lives, the Spartan garrison surrenders and are evacuated. The Thebans of the pro-Spartan party are also allowed to surrender; they are subsequently executed.
- The Thebans are able to reconstitute their old Boeotian confederacy in a new, democratic form. The cities of Boeotia unite as a federation with an executive body composed of seven generals, or Boeotarchs, elected from seven districts throughout Boeotia.

==== Italy ====
- Rome sends colonists to Setia, the inhabitants complain that their numbers are too small. Publius and Gaius Manlius are assigned to the Volsicans for campaign. A defeat follows for the Romans after having been attacked in their camp and foraging parties being killed. The Roman soldiers do not waver even when they have no leader. A dictator is soon afterwards requested but the Volsicans do not know how to follow up a victory. At the end of the year the Parenestines inspire the Latin peoples to revolt.
