= 378 BC =

378 BC in various calendars
Gregorian calendar	378 BC; CCCLXXVIII BC
Ab urbe condita	376
Ancient Egypt era	XXX dynasty, 3
Pharaoh	Nectanebo I, 3
Ancient Greek Olympiad (summer)	100th Olympiad, year 3
Assyrian calendar	4373
Balinese saka calendar	N/A
Bengali calendar	−971 – −970
Berber calendar	573
Buddhist calendar	167
Burmese calendar	−1015
Byzantine calendar	5131–5132
Chinese calendar	壬寅年 (Water Tiger); 2320 or 2113 — to — 癸卯年 (Water Rabbit); 2321 or 2114
Coptic calendar	−661 – −660
Discordian calendar	789
Ethiopian calendar	−385 – −384
Hebrew calendar	3383–3384
- Hindu calendars
Vikram Samvat	−321 – −320
Shaka Samvat	N/A
Kali Yuga	2723–2724
Holocene calendar	9623
Iranian calendar	999 BP – 998 BP
Islamic calendar	1030 BH – 1029 BH
Javanese calendar	N/A
Julian calendar	N/A
Korean calendar	1956
Minguo calendar	2289 before ROC 民前2289年
Nanakshahi calendar	−1845
Thai solar calendar	165–166
Tibetan calendar	阳水虎年 (male Water-Tiger) −251 or −632 or −1404 — to — 阴水兔年 (female Water-Rabbit) −250 or −631 or −1403

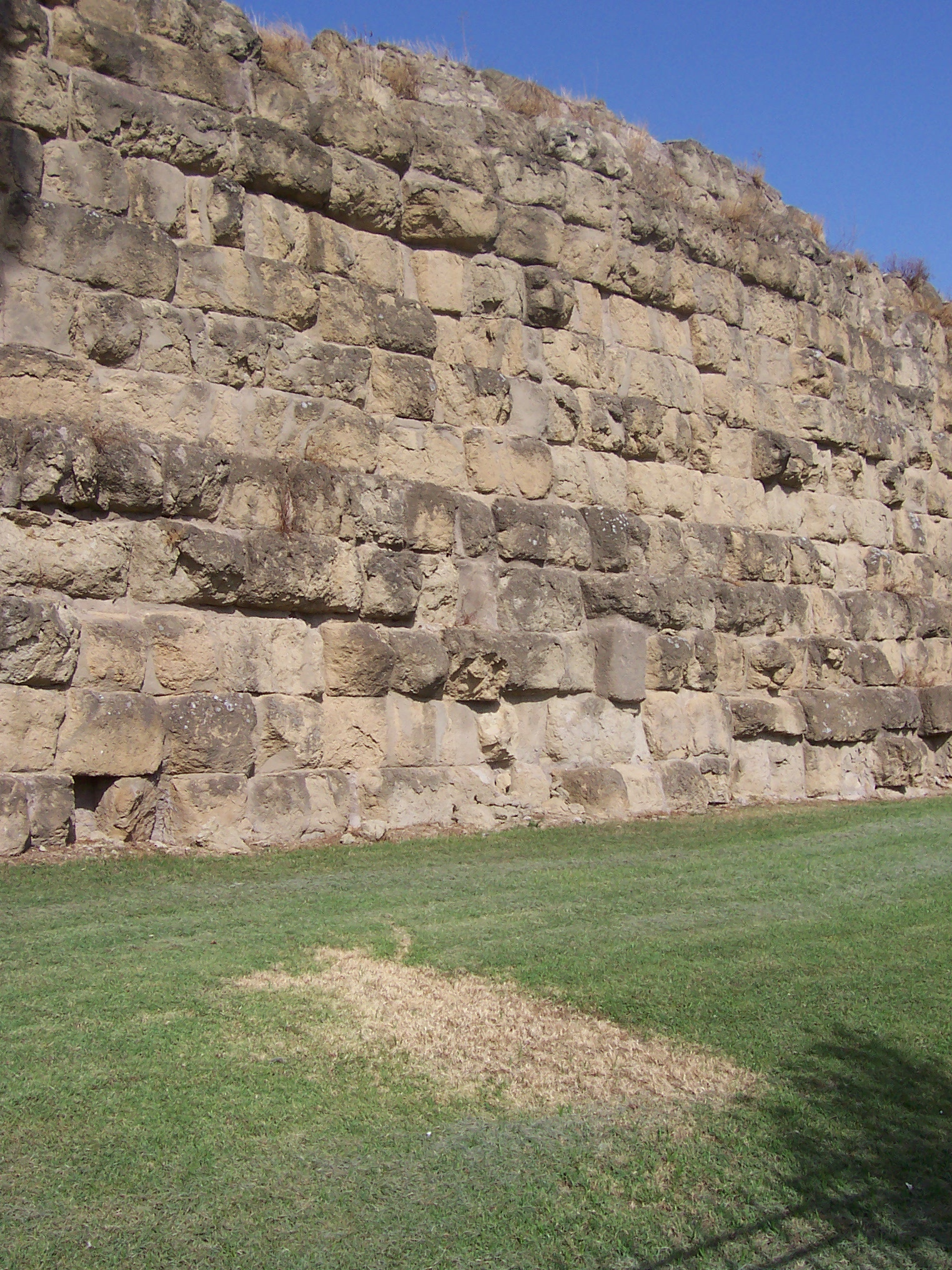
A preserved section of the Servian Wall

Year 378 BC was a year of the pre-Julian Roman calendar. At the time, it was known as the Year of the Tribunate of Medullinus, Fidenas, Lanatus, Siculus, Pulvillus and Macerinus (or, less frequently, year 376 Ab urbe condita). The denomination 378 BC for this year has been used since the early medieval period, when the Anno Domini calendar era became the prevalent method in Europe for naming years.

== Events ==
=== By place ===
==== Greece ====
- The Theban general and statesman, Epaminondas, takes command of Thebes. Pelopidas is elected boeotarch, or chief magistrate, of the city.
- Timotheus, the son of the Athenian general Conon, is elected strategos of Athens.
- A Spartan attempt to seize Piraeus brings Athens closer to Thebes. The Athenian mercenary commander Chabrias successfully faces off the larger army of Agesilaus II near Thebes. At the advance of Agesilaus' forces, instead of giving the order to charge, Chabrias famously orders his men at ease—with the spear remaining pointing upwards instead of towards the enemy, and the shield leaning against the left knee instead of being hoisted against the shoulder. The command is followed immediately and without question by the mercenaries under his command, to be copied by their counterparts beside them, the elite Sacred Band of Thebes under the command of Gorgidas. This "show of contempt" stops the advancing Spartan forces, and shortly afterwards Agesilaus withdraws.
- Athens allies itself with Thebes and forms the Second Athenian League. The confederacy includes most of the Boeotian cities and some of the Ionian islands.

==== Sicily ====
- Dionysius I's third war with Carthage proves disastrous. He suffers a crushing defeat at Cronium and is forced to pay an indemnity of 1,000 talents and cede the territory west of the Halycus River to the Carthaginians.

==== Roman Republic ====
- The Servian Wall is constructed around Rome to prevent the city from being captured or sacked (see 390 BC). This is the first fortification that the Romans build around their home city.
