= 378th =

378th may refer to:

- 378th Bombardment Group, inactive United States Army Air Forces unit
- 378th Fighter Squadron, active United States Air Force unit
- 378th Troop Carrier Squadron, inactive United States Air Force unit

== See also ==
- 378 (number)
- 378, the year 378 (CCCLXXVIII) of the Julian calendar
- 378 BC
