= 379th Division =

379th Division may refer to:

- 379th Infantry Division, Wehrmacht, Germany
- 379th Rifle Division, Soviet Union

== See also ==
- List of military divisions by number
- 379th (disambiguation)
