= Lysicles (general, died 338 BC) =

Athenian military commander (died 338 BC)

Lysicles (Ancient Greek: Λυσικλῆς Lysikles; died 338 BC), one of the commanders of the Athenian army at the battle of Chaeronea, 338 BC, was subsequently condemned to death, upon the accusation of the orator Lycurgus. The speech which Lycurgus delivered against Lysicles is referred to by Harpocration.
