= Decree of Aristoteles =

377 BC decree of the Athenian Assembly

The Decree of Aristoteles (Inscriptiones Graecae II^{2} 43) was a decree passed by the Athenian Assembly in February or March 377 BC. The decree is preserved as the inscription on a stele; it is the most important epigraphical source for the Second Athenian Confederacy. The stele was originally erected near the statue of Zeus Eleutherios and in front of the Stoa of Zeus in Athens. The decree, often known as the "Charter of the Second Athenian Confederacy", formalized earlier Athenian diplomacy inviting states to join Athens and her allies in a permanent alliance. The stele lists around sixty states as being members of the Second Athenian Confederacy, although it is possible that additional states may have also been members.

The Decree of Aristoteles was notable for limiting the overreaching power of Athens over its allies that was characteristic of the Athenian Empire. The decree primarily consisted of rules governing the rights of states in the Confederacy, such as the right to self governance, restrictions on property ownership in outside territories, and military defense of other states in the League. The inscription of the decree was first published in 1852, and it has received much attention from scholars since then.

== Description of stele ==
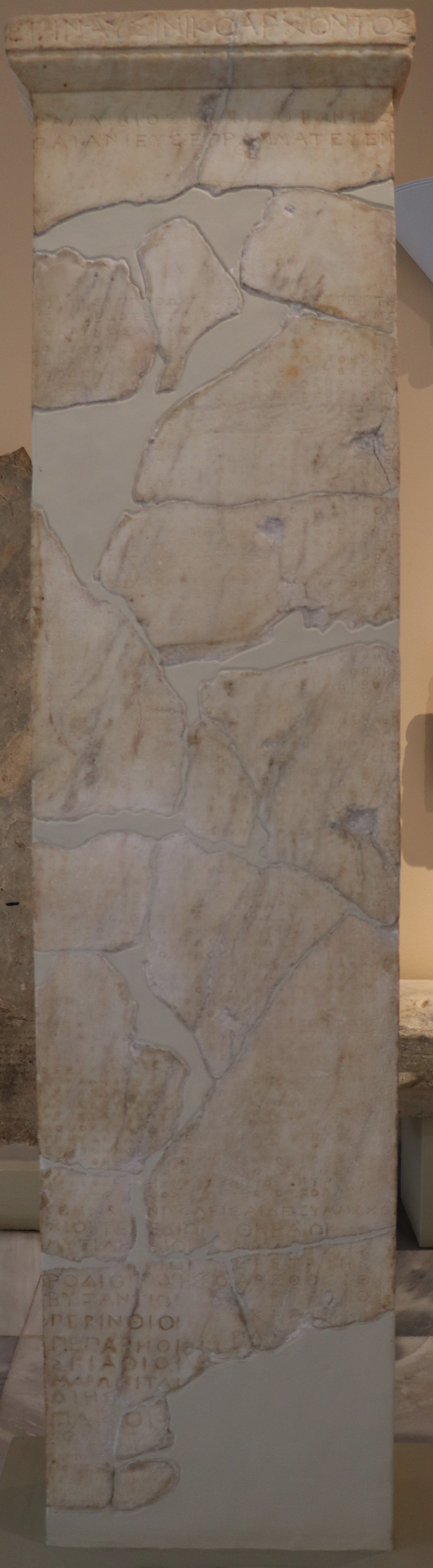
The decree of Aristoteles, establishing the Second Athenian Sea League, IG II^{2} 43

The stele has been rebuilt from twenty fragments and is for the most part well maintained, despite its bottom being missing. While its original height is unknown, the stele in its current form is 1.93 m (6 ft 4 in) tall, 0.44–0.47 m (1 ft 5 in – 1 ft 7 in) wide with slight tapering, and 0.14 m (5.5 in) thick. The shape and content of the stele indicate that very little of it is missing. The stele consists of multiple sections. The top contains a date and introductory area, while the next section consists of the original decree, followed by a list of names of city states, leagues, and individuals. The bottom part of the stele includes an amendment to the original decree and a short concluding entry. There is also a left lateral face of the stele containing an additional list of names. The variance in the sizes and shapes of the letters inscribed on the stone indicate that the stele was cut by at least three different stonemasons.

=== Preservation of the stele ===
The text of the original decree is visible and useful for study. The amendment to the stele, on the other hand, has not been well preserved and has not been completely restored. Some of the names listed in this section are cut off, while a couple lines appear to have been partially erased. Some of the lesser preserved parts of the stele appear to have been edited or modified in other historical periods, while some are simply fragmented or worn down. The fragmented and erased parts of the stele, in addition to the names on the left lateral face of the stele, are at the heart of disagreements between scholars. The stele is currently held in the Epigraphical Museum of Athens.

== Contents and significance of the Decree ==
The decree joins Athens and all named allies in an alliance. The decree assures guarantees and protections to all states in the alliance. The defensive alliance formed by the decree required Athens and its allies to come to the aid of any ally under attack. Notably and unlike in previous alliances, the decree promises "autonomy" and "freedom" to all named states joining the alliance. Allied states were also to be treated equally under the decree with no special privileges allotted to any one state. Additionally, the decree promises self-government for the member states and notably does not impose "garrisons, governors and tribute". These guarantees lie in contrast to the Delian League and the Athenian Empire, particularly in that the member states did not owe tribute to Athens, and that member states could run their preferred form of government rather than having a democracy imposed upon them. The promise of autonomy in the decree only applied to members of the alliance, not to all the states of Greece.

The decree also forbids Athens from holding any form of land in the territories of its allies. To enforce this rule, the decree further spells out mechanisms for Athens' allies to hold Athens in check. Additionally, territories already in Athens' possession were to be relinquished within a certain time period. The synedrion of the Second Athenian League established by the decree, in which Athens held no vote, acted as a court for the Confederacy and made decisions concerning the property of Athens. The rules limiting Athens' territorial holdings were likely in response to lingering distaste from Athens' actions in the 5th century, when the Athenian Empire would confiscate land from its allies.

The stele of the Decree of Aristoteles also served as a record keeper of the members of the Confederacy. A state joining the Second Athenian Confederacy was either recruited or required to apply and consequently completed a set of oaths. Before being added to the stele of the Decree of Aristoteles, an applicant state's magistrates had to submit an oath to a committee sent by the Confederacy. After the oath was completed and the state's name was added to the stele, the state was privy to the protections and benefits of the decree, and the state's representatives were allowed to join the synedrion of the Second Athenian League. Names were added to the stele after the original decree. One state also seems to have been removed from the stele (possibly Iasos). After the 370s the Athenians stopped adding new names to the list, even though the alliance continued to grow.

=== Protection from Sparta and assurances to Persia ===
A portion of the decree was designed to offer protection to Greek states from Sparta. In particular, states were worried about Sparta infringing upon their freedom and autonomy, as well as the growing force of Spartan imperialism. In addition, the decree also signaled to Persia that the Second Athenian Confederacy would not infringe upon their control of other Greek states by specifically not recruiting states under the control of Persia's king or otherwise violating the King's Peace. In this way, the military threat posed by Persia was placated.

Some scholars contend that the Decree of Aristoteles should therefore be perceived as a work of Athenian propaganda, designed to counteract Sparta and pacify Persia. The objective of decree, it is argued, was for Athens to remove the fear of Greek states to join an alliance. From this point of view, the Decree of Aristoteles can be seen as a diplomatic offensive by Athens in response to the growing threat of Sparta during this time period. Other scholars contend that these views are overstated, as evidenced by Athens by in large following the rules outlined in the decree.

The clause dealing with Persia was later deleted. It is most likely that this occurred in or after 367 BC, when Athens became hostile to Persia. Expressions of hostility to Sparta were not removed, even after Athens and Sparta became allies in 369 BC.

=== Athens honors the Decree ===
Scholars agree that Athens for the most part kept the promises made to its allies in the decree. There is no evidence that Athens infringed on the freedom or autonomy of allied states by imposing a system of government upon them, nor did league members ever pay tribute to Athens. Additionally, there is little evidence that any of the allied states in the decree were given special treatment. Athens also came to the defense of numerous allied states as dictated by the defensive alliance provision of the decree. In contrast, allied states did not always come to the defense of Athens when it was under attack.

=== Athens' bilateral alliances outside of the Confederacy ===
Despite the general agreement that Athens by and large followed the decree's promises, some historians believe that Athens maintained the imperialistic aspirations that the decree was designed to curb. While this did not affect the allied states named in the decree, it is suggested that after 375 BC, Athens began forming alliances with other states without adding them to the decree, keeping these relationships to itself instead. While some scholars contend that Athens formed these alliances to rebuild itself as an imperialist power, other scholars argue that many of the bilateral alliances that Athens formed outside of the Confederacy either included the allied states of the Confederacy, or were in direct response to the threat of Philip II upon Greek states. Some scholars also claim that Athens honored the decree more than some of the other allied states listed in the decree, particularly when it came to aiding allies militarily.

== Translations ==
- Georg Busolt, 1874
- F. H. Marshall, 1905
- Silvio Accame, 1941
- Jack Cargill, 1981
- P.J. Rhodes and Robin Osborne, 2003

== Bibliography ==
- Baron, Christopher A. (2006). "The Aristoteles Decree and the Expansion of the Second Athenian League". Hesperia: The Journal of the American School of Classical Studies at Athens. 75 (3).
- Cargill, Jack (1981). The Second Athenian League: Empire or Free Alliance?. London: University of California Press at Berkeley.
- Cargill, Jack (1996). "The Decree of Aristoteles: Some Epigraphical Details". Ancient World. 27: 39–51.
- Hamilton, Charles D. (1980). "Isocrates, IG ii^{2} 43, Greek Propaganda and Imperialism". Traditio. 36.
- Low, Polly (2020). "Remembering, Forgetting, and Rewriting the Past: Athenian Inscriptions and Collective Memory". In Constantakopoulou, C.; Fragoulaki, M. (eds.). Shaping Memory in Ancient Greece: Poetry, Historiography, and Epigraphy (PDF). Histos Supplements. pp. 235–68.
- Rhodes, P.J.; Osborne, Robin (2003). Greek historical inscriptions : 404-323 BC. Oxford, England: Oxford University Press. pp. 92ff. ISBN 9780198153139.
- Stylianou, P. J. (1998). A Historical Commentary on Diodorus Siculus Book 15. New York: Oxford University Press.
