= 379th =

379th may refer to:

- 379th Aero Squadron, training unit assigned to Benbrook Field, former World War I military airfield, 0.5 miles north of Benbrook, Texas
- 379th Air Expeditionary Wing (379 AEW) is a provisional United States Air Force unit assigned to Air Combat Command
- 379th Bombardment Squadron, inactive United States Air Force unit
- 379th Expeditionary Operations Group, provisional United States Air Force unit assigned to the United States Air Forces Central
- 379th Fighter Squadron, inactive United States Air Force unit

== See also ==
- 379 (number)
- 379, the year 379 (CCCLXXIX) of the Julian calendar
- 379 BC
