= Theagenes of Thebes =

4th-century BC Greek commander (died 338 BC)

Theagenes
- Θεαγένης ὁ Θηβαῖος
- Born: Thebes, Boeotia
- Died: 338 BC; Chaeronea, Boeotia
- Military career
- Rank: Commander
- Commands: Sacred Band of Thebes
- Conflicts: Battle of Chaeronea (338 BC)

Theagenes (Greek: Θεαγένης; died 338 BC) was a 4th-century Greek commander who served as the final commander of the Sacred Band of Thebes. He is best known for leading the unit in the Battle of Chaeronea in 338 BC against Alexander the Great, where his forces were crushed and he died alongside his men.

== Military career ==
Theagenes was a Greek commander from Thebes who served as the final leader of the Sacred Band of Thebes. He commanded the elite force at the Battle of Chaeronea in 338 BC, where he and his forces perished on the battlefield during a final stand as his entire unit was annihilated by Macedonian forces under Philip II. According to Plutarch, when King Philip later surveyed the battlefield and saw the fallen elite unit heaped upon one another, he wept and praised their valour, exclaiming, "'Perish any man who suspects that these men either did or suffered anything unseemly.'

== Family ==
Theagenes was the brother of Timoclea, a prominent Theban noblewoman celebrated by ancient historians for her courage during the destruction of Thebes in 335 BC. Following Theagenes' death at Chaeronea, Macedonian forces sacked the city, and a Thracian captain assaulted Timocleia in her home. She outsmarted her captor by claiming her family's gold and valuables were hidden at the bottom of a well in her garden. When the captain leaned over to look inside, she pushed him down the shaft and killed him by throwing heavy stones onto him. Brought before Alexander the Great in chains to face execution, she showed no fear and boldly declared, "Theagenes was my brother, who was a commander at Chaeronea, and lost his life fighting against you in defense of the liberty of the Greeks, that we might not suffer any such thing; and seeing I have suffered things unworthy of my rank, I refuse not to die; for it is better so to do than to experience another such a night as the last, which awaits me unless thou forbid it." Impressed by her dignified bearing and her brother's renowned military reputation, Alexander ordered her immediate release and ensured her family's safety.
