= Athenian Grain-Tax Law of 374/3 B.C. =

Athenian legislation

The Athenian Grain-Tax Law of 374/3 B.C. is an Athenian legislation passed somewhere between the years 374 and 373 B.C. which ordered the grain and barley imported from the islands of Lemnos, Imbros and Skyros to be transported at a specific time to Piraeus, from there brought up to the city, stored in the temple of Aiakos, and sold in the Agora by public officials newly appointed for the purpose. Furthermore, the law allocated the proceeds from the sale of that grain to the military fund.

== Origin ==
The legislation for the Grain-Tax Law was inscribed on a marble stele. This monument was found on July 21, 1986, by John Camp. The monument was found built into a repair of the east wall of the Great Drain where it passes the northeast corner of the Stoa Basileios. It is on this slab that the Athenian legislation is inscribed and although the slab itself has undergone some noticeable water damage and corrosion, the inscription is easily visible.

== Size ==
The stele measures as follows: Height, 1.105 m.; at molding, 0.45m., below molding (level of line 2), 0.422 m., at level of line 61, 0.437m., at bottom, 0.44m.; thickness, 0.115m. The letters measure as follows: Height, lines 1,3-61, 0.007m., line 2, 0.01m.

== Inscription ==
A translated inscription:

Gods. In the archonship of Sokratides. Law concerning the 8 1/3% tax (dodekate) on the grain of the islands. (Line 5) Agyrrhios moved: In order that there may be grain for the people (demos) in the public domain, sell the 8 1/3% tax (dodekate) (which originates) in Lemnos, Imbros, and Skyros, and the 2% tax (pentekoste) in terms of grain. (8) Each portion will consist of 500 measures (medimno), 100 of wheat and 400 of barley. (10) The buyer of the tax (priamenos) will convey the grain to the Peiraieus at his own risk and he will transport the grain up to the city at his own expense and he will heap up the grain in the Aiakeion. (15) The state (polis) will make available the Aiakeion in watertight condition and provided with a door. The buyer of the tax (priamenos) is to weigh out the grain for the state (polis) within thirty days, whenever he has conveyed it up to the city at his own expense. (19) Whenever he has conveyed it up to the city, the state (polis) will not exact rent from the buyers of the tax (priamenoz). (21) The buyer of the tax (priamenos) will weigh out the wheat at a weight of a talent for five sixths (hekteis) and the barley at a weight of a talent per measure (medimno), dry and free from darnel, filling up the measuring table (sekoma) to the [rim?], just as the other merchants (emporoz). (27) The buyer of the tax (priamenos) will not make a down payment but (he will pay) sales taxes (eponia) and herald's fees (kerykeia) of twenty drachmai per portion. (29) The buyer of the tax (priamenos) will provide per portion two solvent guarantors, whomever the council (Boule) has approved. (31) The portion held by a group of six men (symmoria) will consist of 3,000 measures (medimno). (33) The state (polis) will exact the grain from the group (symmoria), both from one man and from all who are in the group, until it recovers what belongs to it. (36) Let the Assembly (demos) elect ten men from all the Athenians in the meeting (ekklesia) at which they elect the generals (strategoi), who are to take care of the grain. (40) After these men have seen to the weighing out of the grain in accordance with the written instructions, let them sell it in the marketplace (agora) at whatever time seems best to the Assembly (demos), but it is not permitted to put the sale of the grain to a vote before the month of Anthesterion. (44) Let the Assembly (demos) set the price at which the elected men must sell the wheat and barley. Let the buyers (priamenoi) of the 8 1/3% tax (dodekate) transport the grain (to the Aiakeion) before the month of Maimakterion. (48) Let the men elected by the Assembly (demos) make sure that the grain is transported in the specified time. (51) When the men who have been elected have sold the grain, let them render their accounts in the Assembly (demos) and let 'them come into the Assembly (demos) carrying the money, and let the amount that is realized from the (sale of the) grain be assigned to the military fund (stratiotika). (55) Let the Receivers (apodektai) allocate the down payment from the islands and of the 2% tax (pentekoste) exactly as much as was fetched last year from the two tenths (dekatoia). (59) For the present it is to belong to the financial administration (dioikesis), and in the future let them not take the two tenths (dekatoia) away from the money that is being paid in.
