= Troilus of Elis =

Ancient Greek athlete

Troilus of Elis was an ancient Greek athlete from Elis who participated at the ancient Olympic Games. He gained controversy by being a referee who won two equestrian events at the 372 BC games. After that a law banned referees from competing. His story has at times been used to show the ancient games had a "win at any cost" mindset quite different from the modern Olympic ideal.
