= Sacred Band of Thebes =

4th-century BC Theban military unit

- Ἱερὸς Λόχος
- Active: 4th century BC
- Country: Thebes
- Allegiance: Theban
- Branch: Theban army
- Type: Heavy infantry
- Role: Close order formation; Frontal assault; Hand-to-hand combat; Line formation; Phalanx; Raiding
- Size: 300 men

The Sacred Band of Thebes (Ancient Greek: Ἱερὸς Λόχος τῶν Θηβῶν, Hieròs Lóchos tôn Thēbôn) was an elite heavy infantry of select soldiers consisting of 150 pairs of male couples, 300 men total, organised by age that formed the elite force of the Theban army in the 4th century BC. It was first organised under commander Gorgidas in 378 BC and later Pelopidas, and played a crucial role in the Battle of Leuctra. It was annihilated by Philip II of Macedon and young Alexander the Great in the Battle of Chaeronea in 338 BC.

== Formation ==
The earliest surviving record of the Sacred Band by name was in 324 BC, in the oration Against Demosthenes by the Athenian logographer Dinarchus. He mentions the Sacred Band as being led by the general Pelopidas and, alongside Epaminondas who commanded the army of Thebes (Boeotia), were responsible for the defeat of the Spartans at the decisive Battle of Leuctra (371 BC).

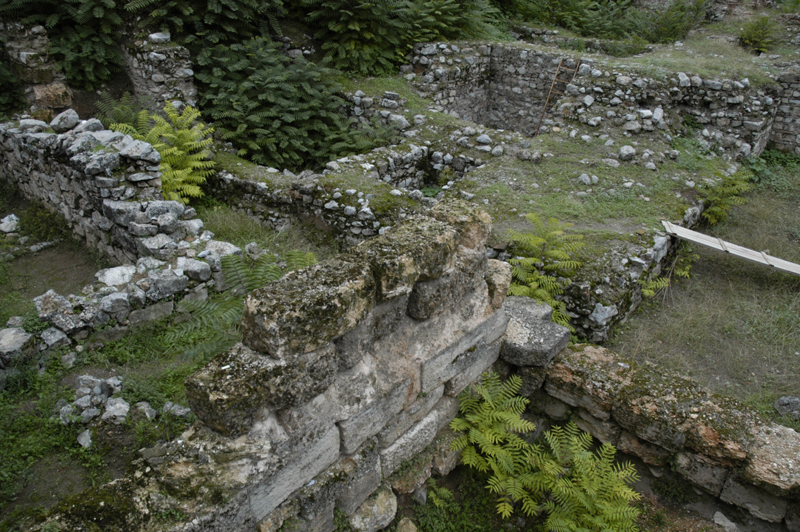
The ruins of ancient Theban citadel of Cadmea

And if there were only some way of contriving that a state or an army should be made up of lovers and their beloved, they would be the very best governors of their own city, abstaining from all dishonour, and emulating one another in honour; and when fighting at each other's side, although a mere handful, they would overcome the world. For what lover would not choose rather to be seen by all mankind than by his beloved, either when abandoning his post or throwing away his arms? He would be ready to die a thousand deaths rather than endure this. Or who would desert his beloved or fail him in the hour of danger?

— Plato, Symposium

Plutarch (46–120 AD), a native of the village of Chaeronea, is the source of the most substantial surviving account of the Sacred Band. He records that the Sacred Band was originally formed by the boeotarch Gorgidas, shortly after the expulsion of the Spartan garrison occupying the Theban citadel of Cadmea. The 2nd century AD Macedonian author Polyaenus in his Stratagems in War also records Gorgidas as the founder of the Sacred Band. However, Dio Chrysostom (c. 40–120 AD), Hieronymus of Rhodes (c. 290–230 BC), and Athenaeus of Naucratis (c. 200 AD) credit Epaminondas instead.

The exact date of the Sacred Band's creation, and whether it was created before or after the Symposium of Plato (c. 424–347 BC) and the similarly titled Symposium by his rival Xenophon (c. 430–354 BC), has also long been debated. The generally accepted date of the Sacred Band's creation is between 379 and 378 BC. Prior to this, there were references to elite Theban forces also numbering 300. Herodotus (c. 484–425 BC) and Thucydides (c. 460–395 BC) both record an elite force of 300 Thebans allied with the Persians, who were annihilated by Athenians in the Battle of Plataea (479 BC). Herodotus describes them as "the first and the finest" (πρῶτοι καὶ ἄριστοι) among Thebans. Diodorus also records 300 picked men (ἄνδρες ἐπίλεκτοι) present in the Battle of Delium (424 BC), composed of heníochoi (ἡνίοχοι, "charioteers") and parabátai (παραβάται, "those who walk beside"). Though none of these mention the Sacred Band by name, these may have referred to the Sacred Band or at least its precursors. Historian John Kinloch Anderson believes that the Sacred Band was indeed present at Delium, and that Gorgidas did not establish it, but merely reformed it.

In the old debate surrounding Xenophon's and Plato's works, the Sacred Band has figured prominently as a possible way of dating which of the two wrote their version of Symposium first. Xenophon's Socrates in his Symposium disapprovingly mentions the practice of placing lovers beside each other in battle in the city-states of Thebes and Elis, arguing that while the practice was acceptable to them, it was shameful for Athenians. Both Plato and Xenophon were Athenians. According to the British classical scholar Sir Kenneth Dover, this was a clear allusion to the Sacred Band, reflecting Xenophon's contemporary, albeit anachronistic, awareness of the Theban practice, as the dramatic date of the work itself is c. 421 BC.

However, it is the speech of the character Phaedrus in Plato's Symposium referring to an "army of lovers" that is most famously connected with the Sacred Band; even though it does not technically refer to the Sacred Band, since the army referred to is hypothetical. Dover argues Plato wrote his Symposium first since Plato's Phaedrus uses language that implies that the organization does not yet exist. He acknowledges, however, that Plato may have simply put the hypothesis in the mouth of Phaedrus according to the supposed earlier dramatic date of the work (c. 416 BC). It only shows that Plato was more mindful of his chronology in his Symposium than Xenophon, and proves that he was actually quite aware of the Sacred Band in his time.

== Composition ==
According to Plutarch, the 300 hand-picked men were chosen by Gorgidas purely for ability and merit, regardless of social class. It was composed of 150 male couples, each pair consisting of an older erastes (ἐραστής, 'lover') and a younger eromenos (ἐρώμενος, 'beloved'). Athenaeus of Naucratis also records the Sacred Band as being composed of "lovers and their favorites, thus indicating the dignity of the god Eros in that they embrace a glorious death in preference to a dishonorable and reprehensible life", while Polyaenus describes the Sacred Band as being composed of men "devoted to each other by mutual obligations of love". The origin of the "sacred" appellation of the Sacred Band is unexplained by Dinarchus and other historians. But Plutarch claims that it was due to an exchange of sacred vows between lover and beloved at the shrine of Iolaus (one of the lovers of Heracles) at Thebes. He also tangentially mentions Plato's characterization of the lover as a "friend inspired of God".

The Sacred Band was stationed in Cadmea as a standing force, likely as defense against future attempts by foreign forces to take the citadel. It was occasionally referred to as the 'City Band' (ἐκ πόλεως λόχος), due to their military training and housing being provided at the expense of the Boeotian polis. Their regular training included wrestling and dance. The historian James G. DeVoto points out that Gorgidas previously served as a hipparch (cavalry officer), therefore equestrian training was also likely provided. The exact ages of the unit's members are not recorded in ancient testimonies. However, comparing them with the Spartan elite unit hippeis (ἱππεῖς) (Note: Hippeis, literally meaning 'cavalry', is also the generic name for Greek elite units of between 300 and 1000 men. Although they initially fought as horsemen, during the 4th century BC they primarily fought as hoplite heavy infantry. Compare with knights. (DeVoto, 1992)) and the Athenian epheboi (ἔφηβοι) recruits, DeVoto estimates that trainees were inducted as full members to the Sacred Band at the ages of 20 to 21, whereupon they were given a full set of armor by their erastai. They likely ended their service at age 30.

== Military history ==
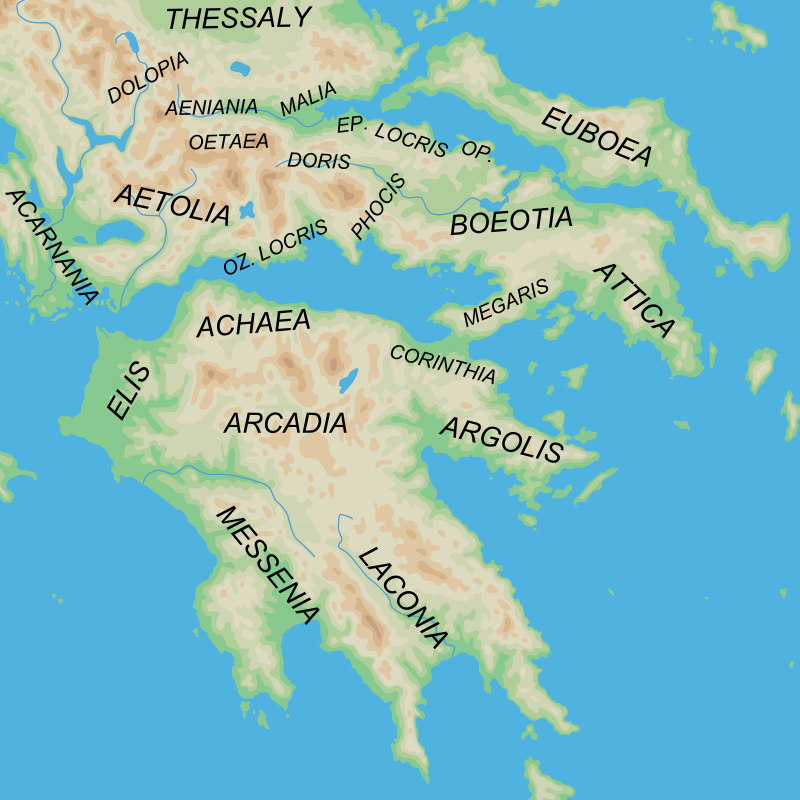
Map of ancient Greece showing the relative positions of the major regions of Boeotia (led by Thebes), Laconia (led by Sparta), and Attica (led by Athens)

According to Plutarch, Gorgidas originally distributed the members of the Sacred Band among the front ranks of the phalanxes of regular infantry. In 375 BC, the command of the band was transferred to the younger boeotarch Pelopidas, one of the original Theban exiles who had led the forces who recaptured Cadmea. Under Pelopidas, the Sacred Band was united as a single unit of shock troops. Their main function was to cripple the enemy by engaging and killing their best men and leaders in battle.

=== Invasions of Agesilaus II ===
The Sacred Band first saw action in 378 BC, at the beginning of the Boeotian War. It was during the famous stand-off between the Athenian mercenary commander (and later strategos) Chabrias (d. 357 BC) and the Spartan King Agesilaus II (444–360 BC). Prior to the creation of the Sacred Band under Gorgidas, the Athenians had helped the Theban exiles retake control of Thebes and the citadel of Cadmea from Sparta. This was followed by Athens openly entering into an alliance with Thebes against Sparta. In the summer of 378 BC, Agesilaus led a Spartan expedition against Thebes from the Boeotian city of Thespiae (then still allied to Sparta).

The Spartan forces were held up for several days by Theban forces manning the earthen stockades at the perimeter of Theban territory. The Spartans eventually breached the fortifications and entered the Theban countryside, devastating the Theban fields in their wake. Though the Athenians had by this time joined the Theban forces, they were still outnumbered by the Spartans. With the fall of the stockades, they were left with two choices, either to retreat back to the defensible walls of Thebes or to hold their ground and face the Spartans in the open. They chose the latter and arrayed their forces along the crest of a low sloping hill, opposite the Spartan forces. Gorgidas and the Sacred Band occupied the front ranks of the Theban forces on the right, while Chabrias and an experienced force of mercenary hoplites occupied the front ranks of the Athenian forces on the left.

Agesilaus first sent out skirmishers to test the combined Theban and Athenian lines. These were easily dispatched by the Theban and Athenian forces, probably by their more numerous cavalry. Agesilaus then commanded the entire Spartan army to advance. He may have hoped that the sight of the massed Spartan forces resolutely moving forward would be enough to intimidate the Theban and Athenian forces into breaking ranks. The same tactic had worked for Agesilaus against Argive forces in the Battle of Coronea (394 BC).

It was during this time that Chabrias gave his most famous command. With scarcely 200 m (660 ft) separating the two armies, Agesilaus was expecting the Theban and Athenian forces to charge at any moment. Instead, Chabrias ordered his men to stand at ease. In unison, his mercenary hoplites immediately assumed the resting posture—with the spear remaining pointing upwards instead of towards the enemy, and the shield propped against the left knee instead of being hoisted at the shoulders. Gorgidas, on seeing this, also commanded the Sacred Band to follow suit, which they did with the same military drill precision and confidence. The audacity of the maneuver and the discipline of the execution was such that Agesilaus halted the advance. Seeing that his attempts to provoke the Theban and Athenian forces to fight on lower ground were unsuccessful, Agesilaus eventually thought it wiser to withdraw his forces back to Thespiae.

Shortly after the stand-off in Thebes, Agesilaus disbanded his army in Thespiae and returned to Peloponnesos through Megara. He left the general Phoebidas as his harmost (military governor) at Thespiae, the same general responsible for the Spartan seizure of the citadel of Cadmea in 382 BC. Phoebidas began making various raids into Theban territory using the Spartans under his command and Thespian conscripts. These forays became so destructive that by the end of the summer, the Thebans went out in force against Thespiae under the command of Gorgidas.

Phoebidas engaged the advancing Theban army with his peltasts. The harrying of the light infantry apparently proved too much for the Thebans and they started to retreat. Phoebidas, hoping for a rout, rashly pursued them closely. However, the Theban forces suddenly turned around and charged Phoebidas' forces. Phoebidas was killed by the Theban cavalry. His peltasts broke ranks and fled back to Thespiae pursued by Theban forces. Aside from Polyaenus, none of these accounts mention the Sacred Band by name, but given that they were under the command of Gorgidas, they are likely to have been part of Theban forces involved.

Not long afterwards, Agesilaus mounted a second expedition against Thebes. After a series of skirmishes which he won with some difficulty, he was forced again to withdraw when the Theban army came out full force as he approached the city. Diodorus observes at this point that the Thebans thereafter faced the Spartans with confidence. Gorgidas disappears from history between 377 and 375, during which the command of the Sacred Band was apparently transferred to Pelopidas. (Note: The historian Louis Crompton presumes that Gorgidas died in a skirmish in 378 BC. (Crompton, 2006))

=== Battle of Tegyra ===
Map of ancient Boeotia showing the location of the city of Orchomenus

As a single unit under Pelopidas, the first recorded victory of the Sacred Band was at the Battle of Tegyra (375 BC). It occurred near the Boeotian city of Orchomenus, then still an ally of Sparta. Hearing reports that the Spartan garrison in Orchomenus had left for Locris, Pelopidas quickly set out with the Sacred Band and a few cavalry, hoping to capture it in their absence. They approached the city through the northeastern route since the waters of Lake Copais were at their fullest during that season. Upon reaching the city, they learned that a new mora had been sent from Sparta to reinforce Orchomenus. Unwilling to engage the new garrison, Pelopidas decided to retreat back to Thebes, retracing their northeastern route along Lake Copais. However, they only reached as far as the shrine of Apollo of Tegyra before encountering the returning Spartan forces from Locris.

The Spartans were composed of two morai led by the polemarchoi Gorgoleon and Theopompus. (Note: The historian P.J. Stylianou believes that only one Spartan mora was defeated in the battle, and that accounts of two morai is a result of the inadvertent inclusion of the second mora in Orchomenus which might have moved out to intercept Pelopidas after he defeated the first one, though they never met in battle. (Stylianou, 1998)) They outnumbered the Thebans at least two to one. According to Plutarch, upon seeing the Spartans, one Theban allegedly told Pelopidas "We are fallen into our enemy's hands" to which Pelopidas replied, "And why not they into ours?" He then ordered his cavalry to ride up from the rear and charge while he reformed the Sacred Band into an abnormally dense formation, hoping to at least cut through the numerically superior Spartan lines. The Spartans advanced, confident in their numbers, only to have their leaders killed immediately in the opening clashes. Leaderless and encountering forces equal in discipline and training for the first time in the Sacred Band, the Spartans faltered and opened their ranks, expecting the Thebans to pass through and escape. Instead, Pelopidas surprised them by using the opening to flank the Spartans. The Spartans were completely routed, with considerable loss of life. The Thebans didn't pursue the fleeing survivors, mindful of the remaining Spartan mora stationed in Orchomenus less than 5 km (3.1 mi) away. They stripped the dead and set up a tropaion (τρόπαιον, a commemorative trophy left at the site of a battle victory) before continuing on to Thebes. Having proven their worth, Pelopidas kept the Sacred Band as a separate tactical unit in all subsequent battles.

An account of the battle was mentioned both by Diodorus and Plutarch, both based heavily on the report by Ephorus. Xenophon conspicuously omits any mention of the Theban victory in his Hellenica, though this has traditionally been ascribed to Xenophon's strong anti-Theban and pro-Spartan sentiments. An obscure allusion to Orchomenus in Hellenica, however, implies that Xenophon was aware of the Spartan defeat.

The exact number of the belligerents on each side varies by account. Diodorus puts the number of Thebans at 500 against the Spartans' 1,000 (each mora consisting of 500 men), apparently basing it on Ephorus' original figures. Plutarch puts the number of the Thebans at 300, and acknowledges three sources for the number of Spartans: 1000 by the account of Ephorus; 1,400 by Callisthenes (c. 360–328 BC); or 1,800 by Polybius (c. 200–118 BC). Some of these numbers may have been exaggerated due to the overall significance of the battle. The battle, while minor, was remarkable for being the first time a Spartan force had been defeated in pitched battle, dispelling the myth of Spartan invincibility. It left a deep impression in Greece and boosted the morale among Boeotians, foreshadowing the later Battle of Leuctra. In Plutarch's own words:

For in all the great wars there had ever been against Greeks or barbarians, the Spartans were never before beaten by a smaller company than their own; nor, indeed, in a set battle, when their number was equal. Hence their courage was thought irresistible, and their high repute before the battle made a conquest already of enemies, who thought themselves no match for the men of Sparta even on equal terms. But this battle first taught the other Greeks, that not only Eurotas, or the country between Babyce and Cnacion, (Note: Places where the Spartan Assembly met.) breeds men of courage and resolution; but that where the youth are ashamed of baseness, and ready to venture in a good cause, where they fly disgrace more than danger, there, wherever it be, are found the bravest and most formidable opponents.

— Plutarch, Pelopidas 17

Shortly after this, the Athenians initiated the Common Peace of 375 BC (Κοινὴ Εἰρήνη, Koine Eirene) among Greek city-states. According to Xenophon, they were alarmed at the growing power of Thebes and weary of fending off Spartan fleets alone as the Thebans were not contributing any money to maintaining the Athenian fleet. However, this broke down soon after in 374 BC, when Athens and Sparta resumed hostilities over Korkyra (modern Corfu). During this time period, Athens also gradually became hostile to Thebes. While Athens and Sparta were busy fighting each other, Thebes resumed her campaigns against the autonomous pro-Spartan Boeotian poleis. Thespiae and Tanagra were subjugated and formally became part of the reestablished democratic Boeotian confederacy. In 373 BC, Thebans under the command of the boeotarch Neocles attacked and razed its traditional rival, the Boeotian city of Plataea. The Plataean citizens were allowed to leave alive, but they were reduced to being refugees and sought sanctuary in Athens. Of the pro-Spartan Boeotian poleis, only Orchomenus remained.

By this time, Thebes had also started attacking Phocian poleis allied to Sparta. Pelopidas is again mentioned as the commander of the abortive Theban siege of the Phocian city of Elateia (c. 372 BC). In response to the Theban army outside the city's walls, the Phocian general Onomarchus brought out all the inhabitants of the city (including the elderly, women, and children) and locked the gates. He then placed the non-combatants directly behind the defenders of Elateia. On seeing this, Pelopidas withdrew his forces, recognizing that the Phocians would fight to the death to protect their loved ones.

By 371 BC, there was another attempt to revive the King's Peace to curb the rise of Thebes. It was initiated by either the Athenians or the Persians (perhaps at the prompting of the Spartans). The Spartans also sent a large force led by King Cleombrotus I (Sparta having two kings simultaneously for most of its history) to Phocis, ready to invade Boeotia if the Thebans refused to attend the peace conference or accept its terms. (Note: Other historians believe that Cleombrotus was already in Phocis during this period, having been sent earlier in 375 BC to reinforce it during the early Theban attacks. (Rhodes, 2006))

=== Battle of Leuctra ===
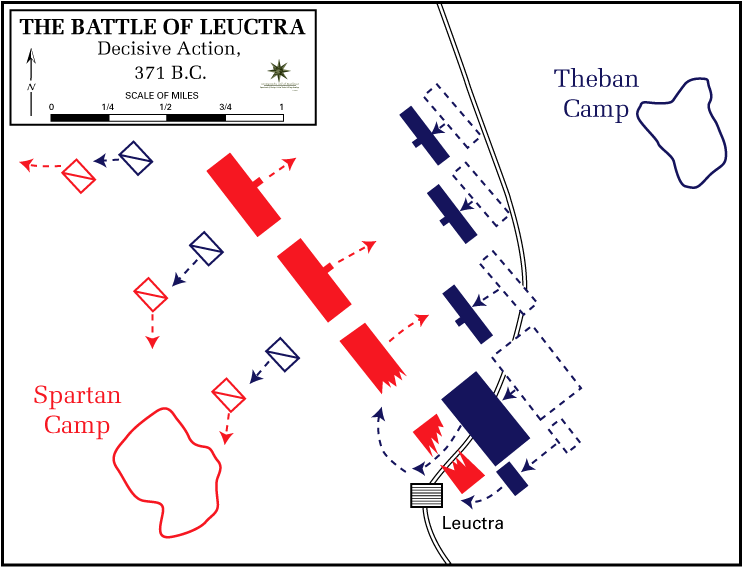
A reconstruction of the Battle of Leuctra. The Theban forces are in blue, while the Spartan forces are in red. The Sacred Band under Pelopidas is the smaller phalanx at the bottom right corner, beside the largest concentration of infantry in the Theban left wing.

Epaminondas' refusal to accept the terms of the peace conference of 371 BC excluded Thebes from the peace treaty and provided Sparta with the excuse to declare war. Shortly thereafter the army of Cleombrotus was ordered to invade Boeotia. Cleombrotus' army crossed the Phocian-Boeotian border into Chaeronea then halted, perhaps hoping that the Thebans might change their mind. The Thebans however were committed to a fight. Cleombrotus then moved inland, following the eastward road towards Thebes, until he reached the Boeotian village of Leuctra (modern Lefktra, Plataies) near the southwestern end of the Theban plain. There they were met by the main Theban army. The two armies pitched their camps opposite each other on two low ridges respectively. The battleground between them was about 900 m (3,000 ft) wide.

The Spartan army numbered about 10,000 hoplites, 1,000 light infantry, and 1,000 cavalry. However, only about 700 hoplites of the Spartan army were composed of spartiates (Spartan citizens), the rest were conscripted troops from Spartan subject states (the perioeci) forced to fight. (Note: Paul Cartledge and other historians believe that the exceedingly tiny proportion of spartiates dominating a force of about 10,000 allied troops (not all of them fully loyal) may have contributed to the defeat. The number of spartiates have been falling catastrophically for over a century, numbering at perhaps not more than 1,500 by the time of the Battle of Leuctra. At the Battle of Nemea (394 BC), for example, spartiates still constituted 6,000 hoplites of an army 19,000 strong. (Cartledge, 2002)) They were arrayed traditionally, in which the hoplites were formed into phalanxes about eight to twelve men deep. Cleombrotus positioned himself and the spartiate hoplites (including the elite royal guard of 300 Hippeis) in the Spartan right wing, the traditional position of honor in Greek armies. Cleombrotus' only tactical innovation was the placing of his cavalry in front of his troops.

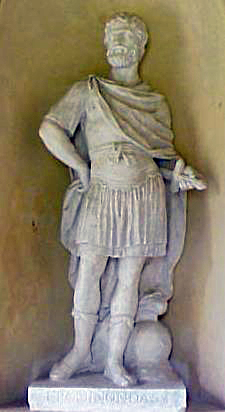
A statue of the boeotarch Epaminondas, who was widely hailed for his brilliant and revolutionary tactics in the Battle of Leuctra

The Theban army was outnumbered by the Spartans, being composed of only about 6,000 hoplites (including the Sacred Band), 1,500 light infantry, and 1,000 cavalry. Anticipating the standard Spartan tactic of flanking enemy armies with their right wing, Epaminondas concentrated his forces on his own left wing, directly opposite the strongest Spartiate phalanx, led by Cleombrotus. Here, the massed Theban phalanx was arrayed into a highly unconventional depth of fifty men. The rest of the Theban lines were reduced to depths of only four to at most eight men because of this. Epaminondas also copied Cleombrotus by placing his cavalry in front of the Theban lines. The original position of the Sacred Band being led by Pelopidas is unknown. Some military historians believe Epaminondas placed Pelopidas and the Sacred Band behind the main hoplite phalanx, others believe he put it in front of the main hoplite phalanx and behind the cavalry, while others put it on the front left corner of the main hoplite phalanx (the most likely). Either way, the Sacred Band is definitely known to have been on the left wing, close to the main Theban forces and detached enough to be able to maneuver freely.

The battle opened with a cavalry charge by both armies. The Spartan cavalry were quickly defeated by the superior Theban cavalry and were chased back to their own side. Their disorderly retreat disrupted the battle lines of the Spartan heavy infantry and, because of the resulting chaos and the dust stirred up, the Spartans were unable to observe the highly unusual advance of the Theban army until the last moment. Epaminondas had ordered his troops to advance diagonally, such that the left wing of the Theban army (with its concentration of forces) would impact with the right wing of the Spartan army well before the other weaker phalanxes. The furthest right wing of the Theban phalanx was even retreating to make this possible. This is the first recorded instance of the military formation later known as the oblique order. (Note: See also the German military tactic Schwerpunkt.) The Theban cavalry also helped by continuing to carry out intermittent attacks along the Spartan battle lines, holding their advance back.

By the time the Spartans realized that something unusual was happening it was already too late. Shortly before the Theban left wing made contact, the Spartans hastily stretched out their right wing in an attempt to outflank and engulf the rapidly approaching Thebans. This was a traditional tactic and, once the Thebans were in range, the stretched wing would then be brought back in an encircling movement. Acting under his own initiative, Pelopidas quickly led the Sacred Band ahead of the Theban left wing to intercept the Spartan maneuver before it could be completed. (Note: Some historians believe that Epaminondas explicitly ordered Pelopidas to intercept the Spartan right wing. (Chrissanthos, 2008; Gabriel, 2001) Others believe that this action was pre-planned (perhaps even rehearsed) and independently performed as part of the Sacred Band's role in the battle. (Jones, 2000)) They succeeded in fixing the Spartans in place until the rest of the Theban heavy infantry finally smashed into the Spartan right wing. The sheer number of Thebans overwhelmed the Spartan right wing quickly. The number of Spartan casualties amounted to about 1,000 dead, among whom were 400 Spartiates and their own king. The Spartan right flank were forced to retreat (after retrieving the body of Cleombrotus). Seeing the Spartiates fleeing in disarray, the Perioeci phalanxes also broke ranks and retreated. Although some Spartans were in favor of resuming the battle in order to recover the bodies of their dead, the allied Perioeci of the Spartan left wing were less than willing to continue fighting (indeed some of them were quite pleased at the turn of events). The remaining polemarchoi eventually decided to request a truce, which the Thebans readily granted. The Spartan dead were returned and a tropaion was set up on the battlefield by the Thebans to commemorate their victory.

According to Pausanias (c. 2nd century AD), the Battle of Leuctra was the most decisive battle ever fought by Greeks against Greeks. Leuctra established Theban independence from Spartan rule and laid the groundwork for the expansion of Theban power, but possibly also for the eventual supremacy of Philip II of Macedon.

=== Battle of Chaeronea ===
Defeat came at the Battle of Chaeronea (338 BC), the decisive contest in which Philip II of Macedon, with his son Alexander, extinguished Theban hegemony. The battle is the culmination of Philip's campaign into central Greece in preparation for a war against Persia. It was fought between the Macedonians and their allies and an alliance of Greek city-states led by Athens and Thebes. Diodorus records that the numbers involved for the two armies were more or less equal, both having around 30,000 men and 2,000 cavalry.

The traditional hoplite infantry was no match for the novel long-speared Macedonian phalanx: the Theban army and its allies broke and fled, but the Sacred Band, although surrounded and overwhelmed, refused to surrender. The Thebans of the Sacred Band held their ground and Plutarch records that all 300 fell where they stood beside their last commander, Theagenes. Their defeat at the battle was a significant victory for Philip, since until then, the Sacred Band was regarded as invincible throughout all of Ancient Greece. Plutarch records that Philip II, on encountering the corpses "heaped one upon another", understanding who they were, wept and exclaimed,

Perish any man who suspects that these men either did or suffered anything unseemly.

— Plutarch, Pelopidas 18

Though the significance of the battle was well-documented by ancient scholars, there is little surviving information on the deployment of the armies involved. Most modern scholars (including N.G.L. Hammond and George Cawkwell) credit Alexander as having led a cavalry wing. James G. DeVoto, likewise, says in The Theban Sacred Band that Alexander had deployed his cavalry behind the Macedonian hoplites, apparently permitting "a Theban break-through in order to effect a cavalry assault while his hoplites regrouped". Other historians however argue that Alexander actually commanded hoplites armed with sarissas (pikes), rather than cavalry. Plutarch and Diodorus both credit Alexander as being the first to engage the Sacred Band.

== Archaeology ==
=== Trophy of the Battle of Leuctra ===
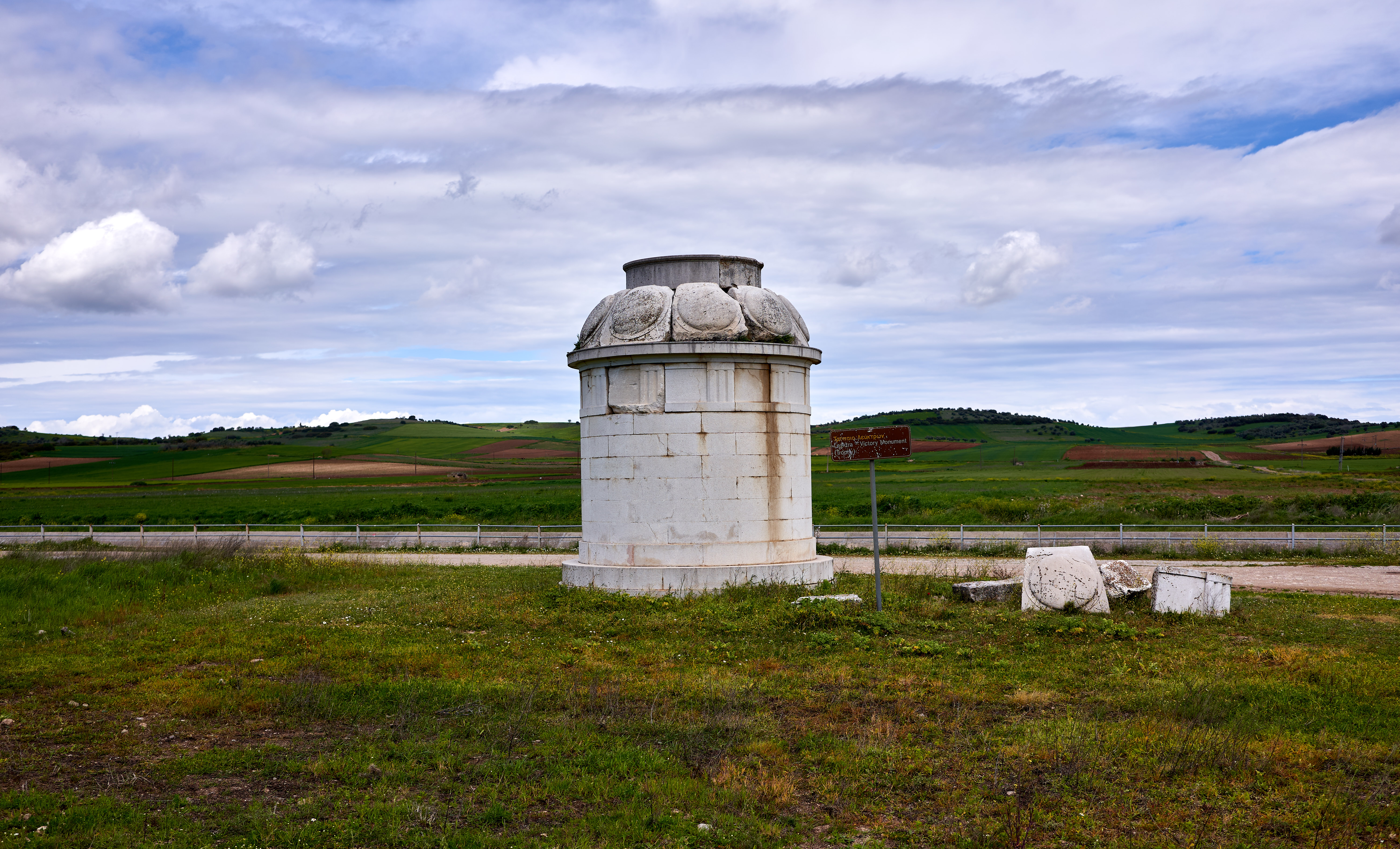
The restored surviving base of the Battle of Leuctra tropaion

After the defeat of Cleombrotus' forces in the Battle of Leuctra, a tropaion was set up on the battlefield by the Thebans to commemorate their victory. The tropaion was later replaced by a permanent monument, an unprecedented move by the Thebans as tropaia were designed to be ephemeral. The original appearance of the monument is attested by contemporary coins of the period and showed that it took the form of a tree trunk mounted upon a cylindrical pedestal carved with metopes, triglyphs, and a series of stone shields. On the tree trunk itself are affixed the shields, weapons, and armor of the defeated Spartans. The base of the monument still survives to this day.

=== Lion of Chaeronea ===
Pausanias in his Description of Greece mentions that the Thebans had erected a gigantic statue of a lion near the village of Chaeronea, surmounting the polyandrion (πολυάνδριον, common tomb) of the Thebans killed in battle against Philip. The Greek historian Strabo (c. 64 BC – 24 AD) also mentions "tombs of those who fell in the battle" erected at public expense in Chaeronea.

In 1818, a British architect named George Ledwell Taylor spent a summer in Greece with two friends at Livadeia. On June 3, they decided to go horseback riding to the nearby village of Chaeronea using Pausanias' Description of Greece as a guidebook. Two hours away from the village, Taylor's horse momentarily stumbled on a piece of marble jutting from the ground. Looking back at the rock, he was struck by its appearance of being sculpted and called for their party to stop. They dismounted and dug at it with their riding-whips, ascertaining that it was indeed sculpture. They enlisted the help of some nearby farmers until they finally uncovered the massive head of a stone lion which they recognized as the same lion mentioned by Pausanias. Parts of the statue had broken off and a good deal of it still remained buried. They immediately reported their discovery when they returned to Athens.

A common story, still often reported to this day, is that the lion was smashed to pieces during the subsequent Greek War of Independence (1821–1829), even using dynamite, by the klepht leader Odysseas Androutsos, who supposedly hoped to find it filled with treasure. This tale was current already in the 1830s, but has been strongly refuted. The five pieces (head, neck, chest, and forelegs) into which the statue was divided for most of the 19th century, before its reconstruction in 1902, bore no evidence of an explosion, but were cleanly cut, likely being the original pieces that formed the statue. Androutsos is held to have been the one to unearth the statue during his tenure as local military governor by Ali Pasha of Yanina in 1819, but the statue had likely fallen apart due to the poor quality of the pedestal's material.

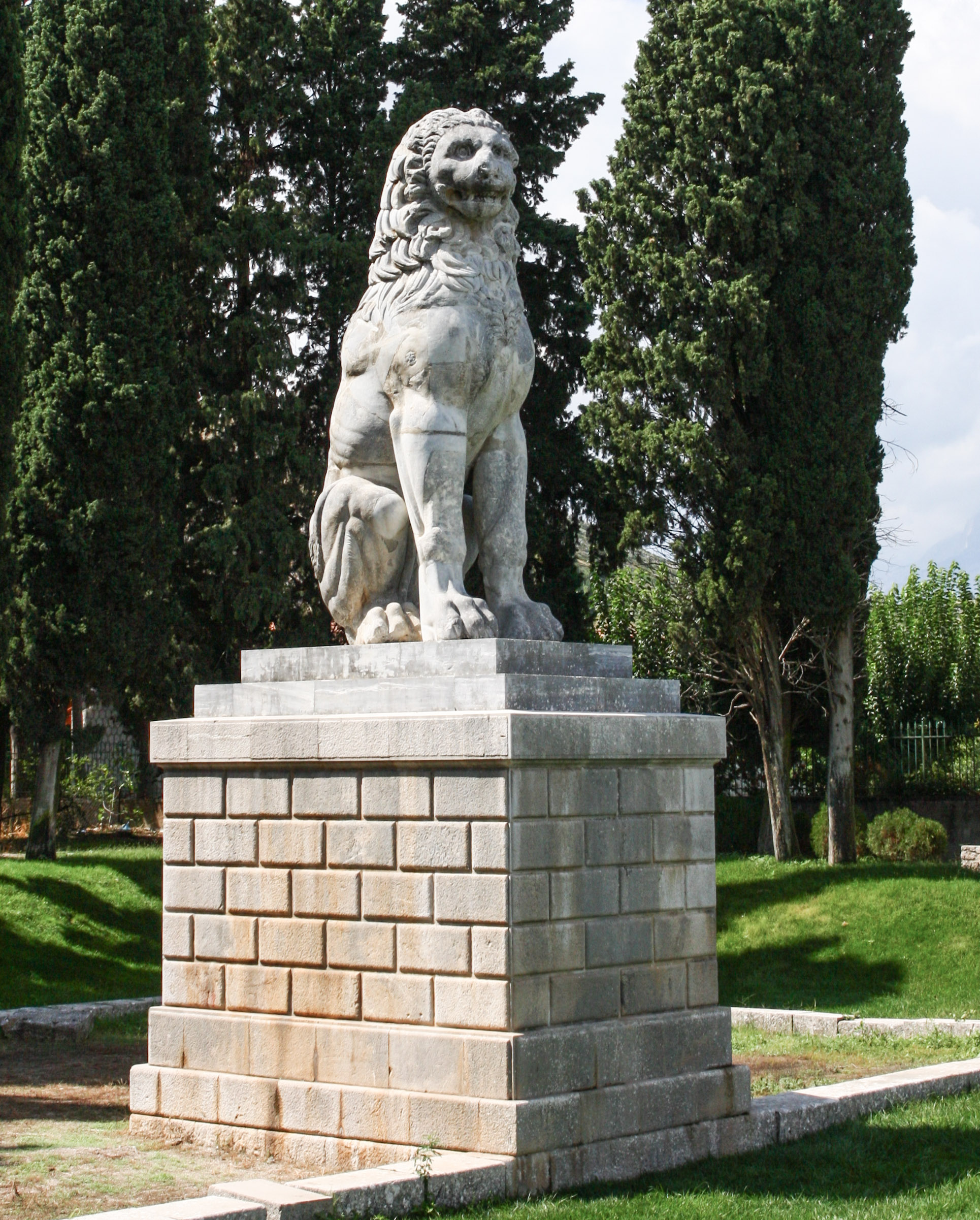
The Lion of Chaeronea in 2009. Excavation of the quadrangular enclosure brought to light 254 skeletons, laid out in seven rows.

Offers in the late 19th century by the British archeologist Cecil Harcourt Smith to fund the restoration of Lion of Chaeronea were initially refused by the Greeks. In 1902, however, permission was granted and the monument was pieced back together with funding by the Order of Chaeronea. The lion, which stands about 12.5 ft (3.8 m) high, was mounted on a reconstructed pedestal about 10 ft (3.0 m) high.

In the late 19th century, excavations in the area revealed that the monument stood at the edge of a quadrangular enclosure. The skeletons of 254 men laid out in seven rows were found buried within it. A tumulus near the monument was also tentatively identified as the site of the Macedonian polyandrion where the Macedonian dead were cremated. Excavation of the tumulus between 1902 and 1903 by the archeologist Georgios Soteriades confirmed this. At the center of the mound, about 22 ft (6.7 m) deep, was a layer of ashes, charred logs, and bones about 0.75 m (2.5 ft) thick. Recovered among these were vases and coins dated to the 4th century BC. Swords and remarkably long spearheads measuring about 15 in (38 cm) were also discovered, which Soteriades identified as the Macedonian sarissas.

The skeletons within the enclosure of the lion monument are generally accepted to be the remains of the Sacred Band, as the number given by Plutarch was probably an approximation. (Note: Other historians who accept the figure of 300 as literal instead assume that 26 members of the Sacred Band survived. (Ashley, 2004)) However, historians such as Nicholas Geoffrey Lemprière Hammond, Karl Julius Beloch, and Vincenzo Costanzi do not believe that the lion monument marks the location of the Sacred Band dead. Hammond claims it was the place where Philip turned his army around during the Battle of Chaeronea and believes that it contains the members of the Macedonian right flank who perished. He argues that it is highly improbable that the Thebans would be able to commemorate their dead within Philip's lifetime with such a massive and obviously expensive monument.

The historian William K. Pritchett criticizes Hammond's rationale as "subjective" and counters it with a passage from Historiarum Philippicarum Libri XLIV of the 3rd-century AD Roman historian Justin. In addition to Pausanias and Strabo, Justin also clearly says that Philip forced the Thebans to pay for the privilege of burying (not cremating) their dead. Therefore, the cremated remains are likely to be Macedonian, while the remains around the lion were the Sacred Band. Philip, after all, was known for his ability to inflict unnecessary cruelty when it served a greater purpose. He further points out that questioning the honesty of Pausanias is unwarranted, as any well-informed Greek then would probably know the ascription of the monument even centuries after the battle; Pausanias' knowledge of topography was not second-hand and his testimony was echoed independently by other ancient sources such as Strabo and Justin. Indeed, Pausanias' Description of Greece has proved to be an accurate and important guide to modern archeologists in rediscovering the locations of other ancient Greek monuments and buildings.

== Historicity ==
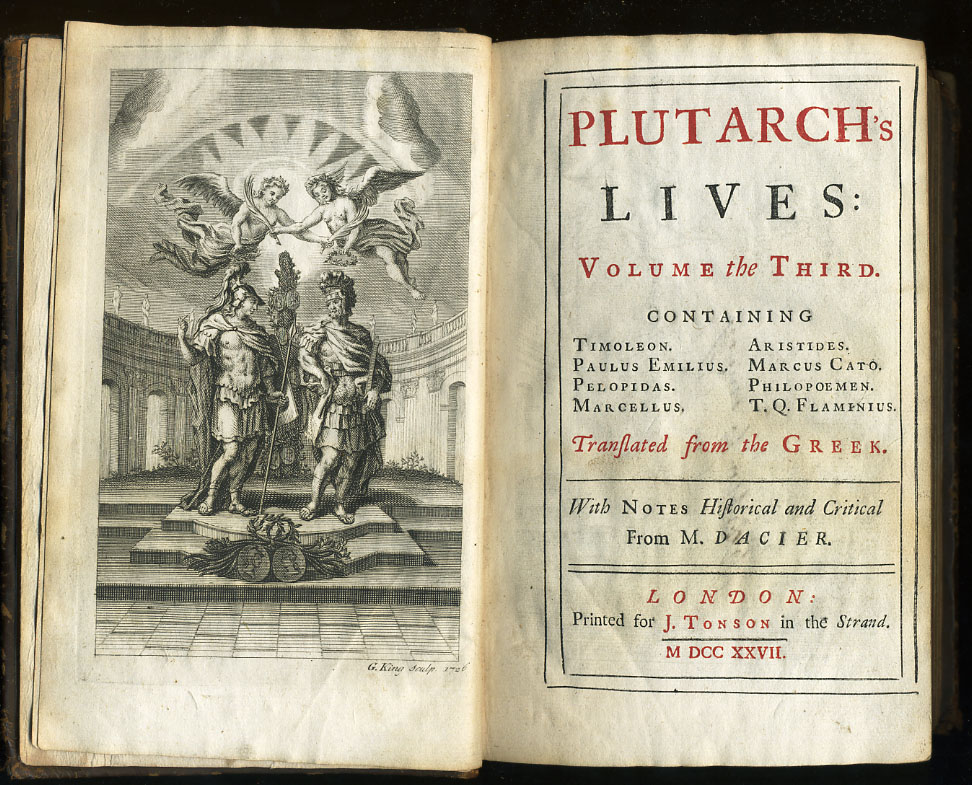
Plutarch's Lives (pictured: the 1727 edition of the English translation by André Dacier) is the main source for the most substantial surviving account of the Sacred Band. It is believed to be mostly based on the works of the Sacred Band's contemporaries Callisthenes and Ephorus. Unfortunately the works of the latter two have been lost to history.

It is detailed in the writings of numerous classical authors, especially Plutarch. Noted classical historians such as John Kinloch Anderson and George Cawkwell accept Plutarch's Life of Pelopidas, which contains the most detailed account of the Sacred Band, as a highly reliable account of the events, in contrast to Xenophon's patchy treatment of Theban history. Other noted classical scholars like Frank William Walbank and Felix Jacoby have also defended Callisthenes' descriptions of land battles in the past. Walbank commented that his depictions of the Battle of the Eurymedon, Gaugamela, and Tegyra (all surviving through Plutarch) are quite adequate. While Jacoby, responding to claims that Callisthenes was unreliable in accounts of land battles in contrast to Xenophon, pointed out that Callisthenes did accurately describe the details on the Battle of Tegyra. He summarized his opinion of Callisthenes' account with "Sie ist panegyrisch gehalten, aber sachlich nicht unrichtig. [It is panegyrical, but it is not factually incorrect.]" This is echoed by the historians John Buckler and Hans Beck who conclude that "In sum, Plutarch's description of the battle of Tegyra does justice both to the terrain of Polygyra and to the information gleaned from his fourth-century sources. There is nothing implausible or unusual in Plutarch's account, and every reason to consider it one of the best of his battle pieces." They also had the same opinion of his account on Leuctra, dismissing assertions that his accounts were confused or rhetorical.

Recently, however, the existence of such a band of heroic lovers has come into question. Citing Xenophon's surprising failure to mention it in his work the Hellenica-a political and military history of the first part of the 4th century as the evidence, Leitao (2002) argues that "the historicity of an erotic Sacred Band rests on the most pre- carious of foundations" (p. 143).

But the historian Gordon S. Shrimpton further provides an explanation for Xenophon's silence on much of Theban history. He notes that all the surviving contemporary accounts of Thebes during the period of Theban hegemony between 371 and 341 BC were often highly critical; with their failures ridiculed and their accomplishments usually being downplayed or omitted altogether. For instance, the Athenian Isocrates (436–338 BC) in his Plataicus (which details the destruction of Plataea by the Thebans), makes no mention of the Theban victory in Leuctra, and harshly reviles Thebes throughout. His later work Archidamus mention Leuctra briefly, and only to criticize Thebans as being incompetent and incapable of capitalizing on their rise to power. The same sentiments are echoed by the Athenians Demosthenes (384–322 BC) and Antisthenes (c. 445 – c. 365 BC). Xenophon, another Athenian, is the only contemporary who grudgingly notes some Theban accomplishments, and even then, never in-depth and with numerous omissions. His only mentions of Pelopidas and Epaminondas by name, for example, were very brief and shed no light on their previous accomplishments. Indeed, the historians Bruce LaForse and John Buckler have noted that the character and accomplishments of Epaminondas were so unassailable that there is no known hostile account of him in ancient sources. The most unfriendly writers like Xenophon and Isocrates could do was omit his accomplishments in their work altogether.

Shrimpton believes that the apparent indifference of earlier authors was due to the general hatred by other Greeks against the Thebans who had medized (i.e. allied with the Persians) in the second Persian invasion in 480 BC and again in 368 BC. Athenians, in particular, held a special contempt for Thebes due to the latter's actions in the Peloponnesian War; as well as the Thebans' destruction of Plataea in 373 BC, and the invasion of the Athenian-allied Boeotian city of Oropus in 366 BC. Demosthenes records this sentiment very clearly in a disclaimer in his speech "On the Navy" (354 BC): "It is difficult to speak to you about [Thebans], because you have such a hearty dislike of them that you would not care to hear any good of them, even if it were true."

This sentiment changed in 339 BC, when Thebes abruptly severed its alliance with Philip II (after being convinced by a speech from Demosthenes) and joined the Athenian-led Pan-Hellenic alliance against Macedonia, with the result being the annihilation of the Sacred Band in Chaeronea and the destruction of the city of Thebes itself in 335 BC by the Macedonians. In light of these actions, Athenians eventually changed their opinions on Thebes, now regarding it in a sympathetic light as a fallen ally. It was during this period that much of the accounts favorable to Thebans were at last written. Works by authors like Anaximenes of Lampsacus, Aristoxenus, Callisthenes, Daimachus, Dinarchus, and Ephorus are believed to have been written between 330 and 310 BC. Except for Dinarchus, almost all of them have been lost to history or survive only in fragments. Among them are Ephorus and Callisthenes, who were contemporaries of the Theban hegemony and the Sacred Band. The works of the latter two, however, survived long enough for later authors like Plutarch, Diodorus, and Polyaenus to base their works on.

The digging of the polyandrion of Chaeronea showed 254 skeletons lying in seven rows, mimicking the arrangement of a phalanx. Some pairs of corpses had their arms linked together at the elbows, suggesting their nature as lovers.

== Major battles ==
- Battle of Chaeronea (338 BC)
- Battle of Cynoscephalae (364 BC)
- Battle of Leuctra
- Battle of Mantinea (362 BC)
- Battle of Tegyra

== See also ==
- Homosexuality in the militaries of ancient Greece
- Homosexuality in ancient Greece
- Blood brother
- The Sacred Band of Stepsons
- Sacred Band of Carthage
- Sacred Band (1821) – Greek battalion in the Greek War of Independence
- Sacred Band (World War II) – Greek special forces unit in World War II
