= Second Athenian League =

4th-century BC maritime confederation of Aegean city-states

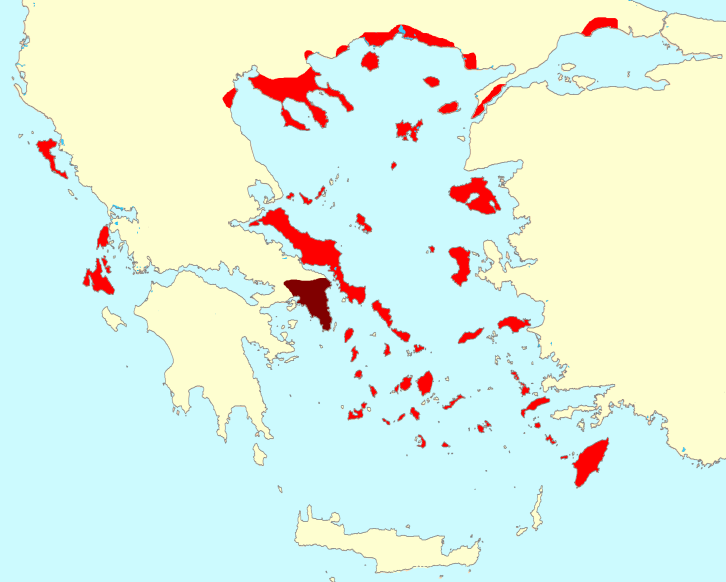
Map of the states that joined the Second Athenian League

The Second Athenian League was a maritime confederation of Greek city-states that existed from 378 to 355 BC under the hegemony of Athens. It is sometimes referenced as the second Athenian Empire, despite operating as a confederation. The symmachia represented a partial revival of the Delian League, which had been disbanded in 404 BC following the defeat of Athens in the Peloponnesian War. The new League was centered in the Aegean and included over 60 states, among which were Kos, Mytilene, Rhodes, and Byzantium. It was primarily formed as a defensive alliance against Sparta and secondly the Persian Empire. The new League's main objective was to preserve peace in Greece and counterbalance Sparta's growing hegemony and aggression. The League largely revived Athenian influence in the Greek world, reestablishing it as the strongest naval power in the eastern Mediterranean. This time, Athens made conscious efforts to avoid the strict terms that had eventually rendered the previous Delian League unpopular. The alliance lasted until 355 BC, when most of the allied cities became independent following the Social War that broke out in 357 BC.

== Background ==
In 478 BC, Athens founded the Delian League to counter Persian influence during the Greco-Persian Wars. Athenian leadership became solidified over the next few decades, with many historians considering the league to be an Athenian Empire, especially after the treasury was moved from Delos to Athens in 454 BC. This league fought against the Peloponnesian League, dominated by Sparta, in the Peloponnesian War, which lasted from 431 to 404 BC. It ended after a siege of Athens in 404 BC, when Athens and Sparta struck a peace deal establishing Spartan hegemony over the Greek world. The Corinthians and Thebans, both Spartan allies, wanted to destroy Athens and enslave its citizens instead of a more lenient peace deal. The Spartans rejected this due to Athens being a major factor in holding up the balance of power in the Attica, Boiotia and Isthmos regions, and instead imposed the following terms: the Athenian walls and fortifications were to be destroyed, the Athenian fleet was to be decommissioned except for twelve ships, Athenian exiles were to be allowed back to the city, and Athens was to acknowledge Spartan leadership and join the Spartan alliance network, allowing Sparta to dictate its foreign policy.

Sparta's former allies turned against it in 395 BC, with Thebes instigating a Spartan attack that would lead to the Corinthian War. This pit Sparta against a coalition of Athens, Thebes, Corinth, and Argos, which was backed by Persia. After a series of Athenian successes, Persia enforced the Peace of Antalcidas: it would take control of all Greek cities in Asia Minor as well as the island of Cyprus and guarantee the independence of all other Greek cities with the exceptions of Lemnos, Imbros, and Scyros, which would belong to Athens. This war empowered Athens for the first time since the end of the Peloponnesian War, allowing it to rebuild its previously decommissioned fortifications and its navy.

== Origins ==
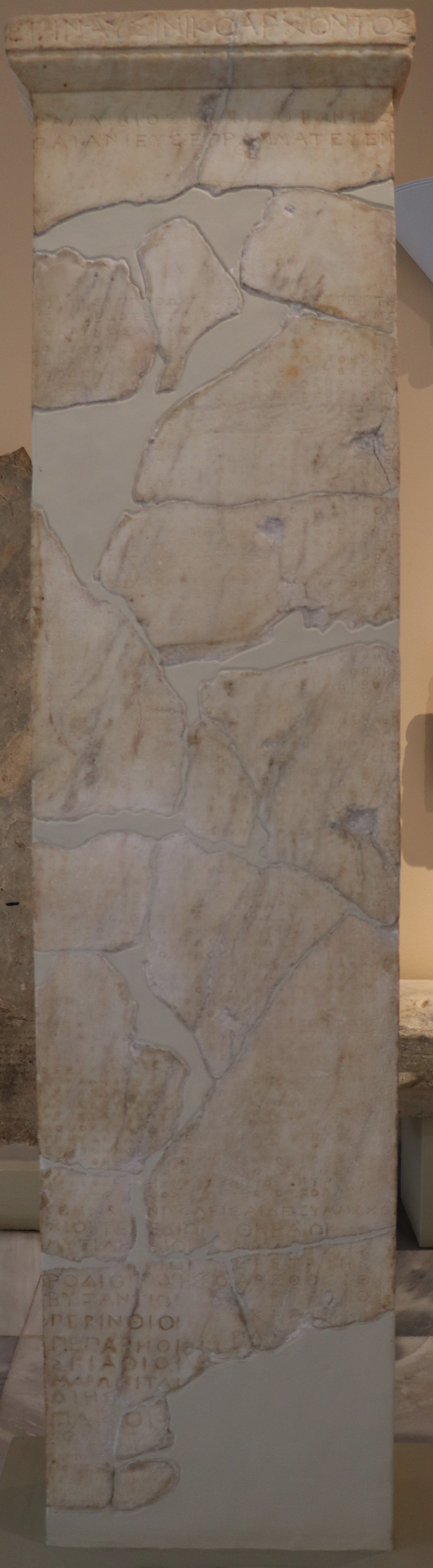
The decree of Aristoteles, establishing the Second Athenian Sea League, IG II^{2} 43

The formation of the League was stimulated by three major events that caused relations between Athens and Sparta to deteriorate. The first event was Spartan intervention in a factional conflict within Thebes. In 382 BC, Sparta sent a force led by the general Eudamidas and his brother Phoebidas to combat the expansion of Olynthus in Chalkidiki, northern Greece. On the way to Olynthus Phoebidas stopped near Thebes, where the two polemarchs Ismenias and Leontiades were locked in a power struggle for control of Thebes. Ismenias was pro-democracy and anti-Sparta so Leontiades convinced Phoebidas, who is described by Xenophon as driven by desire to perform good deeds but lacking in reasoning capacity, that it would be in Sparta's interest to help him take control of Thebes. Phoebidas agreed and helped him take the citadel and imprison Ismenias, which led to about 300 of his supporters fleeing in exile to Athens. Although this Spartan interference in Thebes represented a flagrant violation of the Peace of Antalcidas, Leontiades argued that the Spartans should not punish Phoebidas because his actions had only served to help Sparta. The Spartans agreed, deciding to keep the Thebian citadel and put Ismenias to death.

The second event was the outbreak of the Boeotian War, directly caused by the Spartan intervention in Thebes. In 378 BC, some of the exiles from this intervention returned to Thebes and assassinated Leontiades, overthrowing the pro-Spartan tyranny. The Spartan governor sent for reinforcements, but they were destroyed during their approach by Theban cavalry. The cavalry then stormed the Theban acropolis and restored a popular anti-Spartan government. This led to war between Sparta and Thebes.

The third event was the invasion of Piraeus, an Athenian port in Attica, by the Spartan general Sphodrias in winter of 378 BC. Diodorus Siculus claims that the invasion was ordered by the Spartan king Cleombrotus, while other historians like Xenophon argue that Sphodrias was bribed by Thebes as part of a plot to bring Athens to their side in the war against Sparta. The Spartan ambassadors stationed in Athens promised that Sphodrias would be convicted and punished in Sparta, but he was acquitted in what Siculus calls a "miscarriage of justice". This caused Athens to seek alliances against Sparta, so they reached out to Aegean cities under harsh Spartan control including Chios, Byzantium, Rhodes, and Mytilene. These cities sent representatives to Athens who signed the Decree of Aristoteles, which outlined the terms of the Second Athenian League.

== Charter and policy ==
An inscribed prospectus for the League was found at Athens dating to 377 BC, detailing the aims of the new league. The terms of the league were as follows: meetings would be held in Athens, but every city would enjoy one vote no matter its size and would retain its independence. Unlike the terms of the Delian League, these terms did not include forced garrisons or tribute, and Athenian citizens were prohibited from owning property in other member states. Athens framed these terms as a departure from those of the Delian League, which had been unpopular among tribute states due to the ruthlessness of Athenian hegemony and the harsh punishments against states that rebelled. Athens also convinced foreign powers, including Sparta and Persia, that the charter was a way to enforce the Peace of Antalcidas instead of a subversion of it.

Many historians consider the Second Athenian League to be a resurgence of Athenian hegemony over Greece. Some, such as the historian of ancient Greece Jack Cargill, argue that this league was different from the Delian League and that it did not represent a new Athenian Empire. He argues that the main cause of defections was Thebes, which left the league in 371 BC and incited other states to leave.

== Rise of Thebes ==
Thebes joined the league at its founding because one of the main points of the charter was opposition to Sparta. However, relations between Thebes and the rest of the league soon became difficult and Athens started to realize that Thebes was not necessarily to be trusted. For example, Thebes destroyed Plataea in 372 BC, which had only recently been re-founded. Athens started to think about negotiating peace with Sparta; it was while Athens was discussing this with Sparta that Thebes defeated the Spartan army decisively at the Battle of Leuctra (371 BC). This led to the end of the Beotian War and, with it, Spartan hegemony over Greece. Thebes soon left the league and established hegemony of its own.

== Later history and disintegration ==
After Sparta's defeat in 371 BC, Thebes seceded from the League and was able to violate the terms of the Peace of Antalcidas with impunity. Later, a series of revolts rocked the league, culminating with the Social War (357–355 BC) in which the states of Chios, Rhodes, Kos, and Byzantium went to war against Athens. This war ended in the disintegration of the Second Athenian League.

== See also ==
- Athenian Grain-Tax Law of 374/3 B.C.
- Iphicrates
