= Cadmea =

Citadel in ancient Thebes, Greece

Coordinates: 38.32085°N 23.31778°E

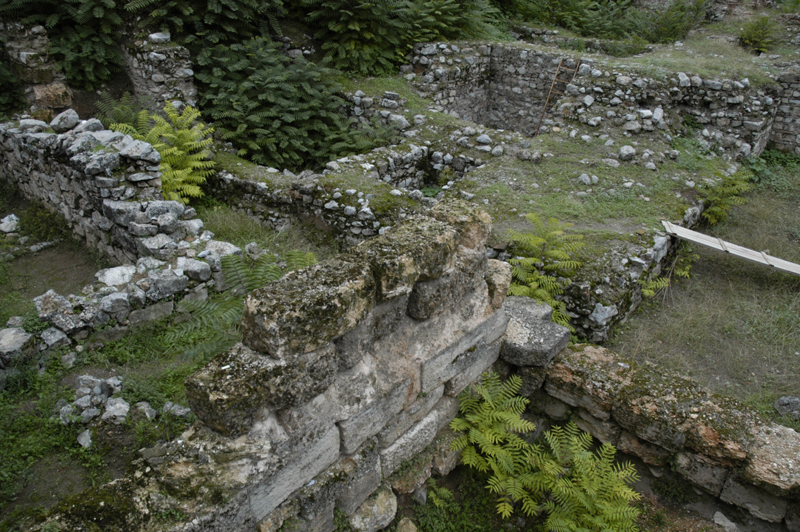
Ruins of the Cadmea.

The Cadmea, or Cadmeia (Greek: Καδμεία, Kadmía), was the citadel of ancient Thebes, Greece, which was named after Cadmus, the legendary founder of Thebes. The area is thought to have been settled since at least the early Bronze Age, although the history of settlement can only be reliably dated from the late Mycenaean period (c. 1400 BC).

== Classical period ==
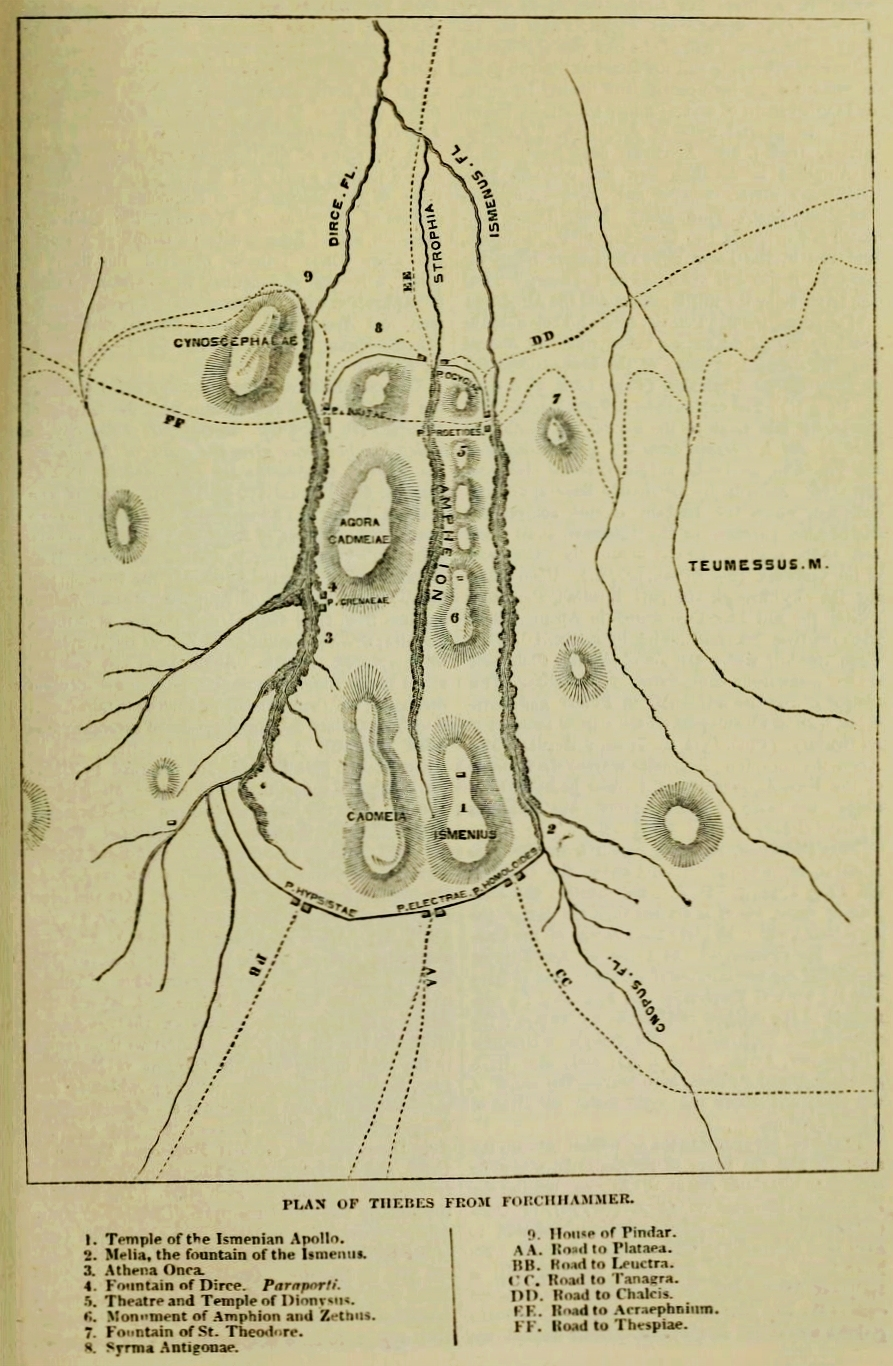
Map of the Topography of Ancient Thebes showing the location of the Cadmea

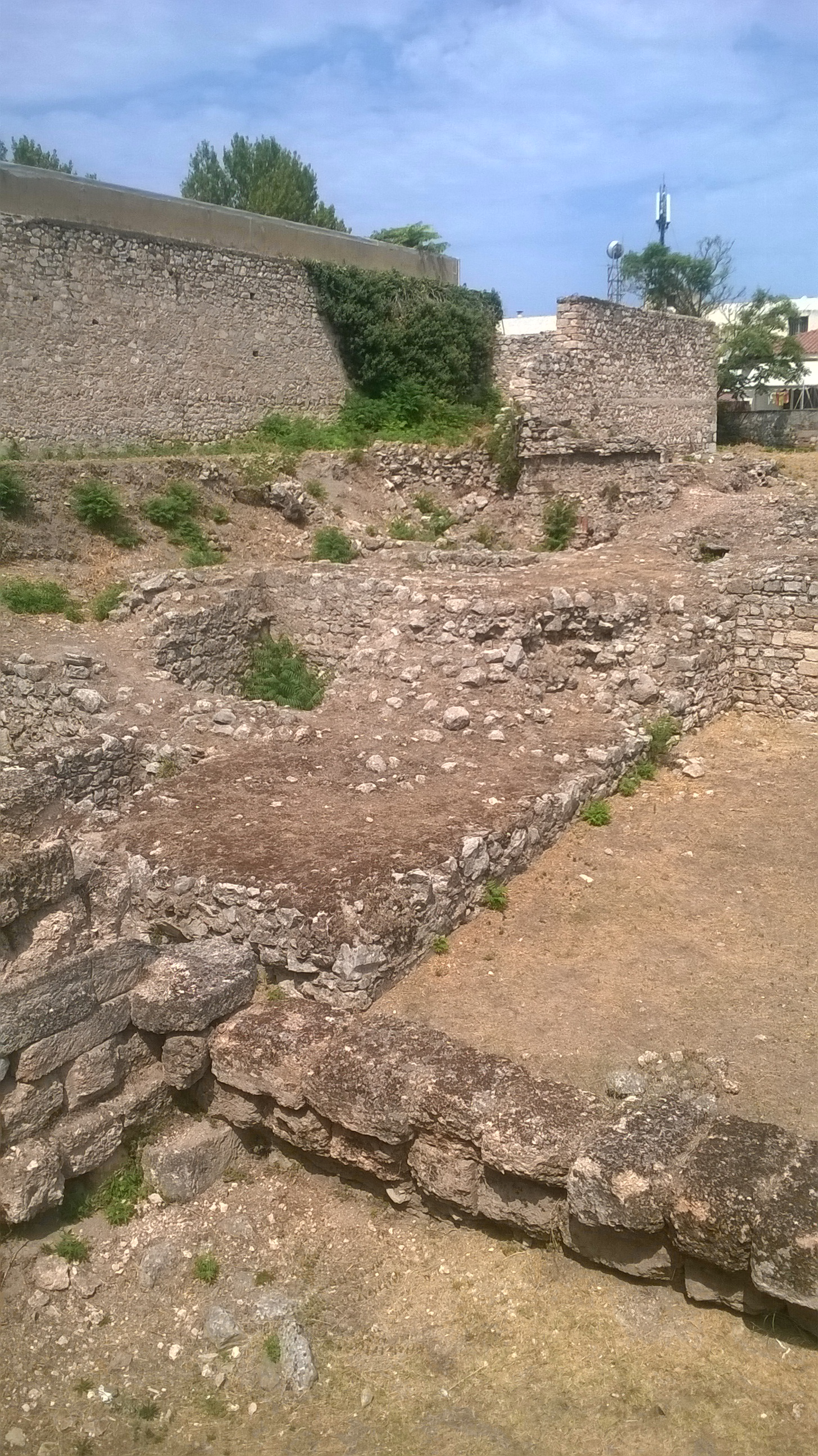
Site of the Cadmea in 2016

In the classical and the early Hellenistic periods, the Cadmea served a similar purpose to the Acropolis of Athens; many public buildings were situated there, and the assemblies of Thebes and the Boeotian Confederacy are thought to have met there. During the Spartan (382–379/2 BC) and Macedonian occupations of Thebes, foreign garrisons were stationed on the Cadmea. Phoebidas was the Spartan general responsible for the unauthorized seizure of the citadel of Cadmea in 382 BC, in violation of the Peace of Antalcidas in place then.

The Sacred Band of Thebes was stationed in Cadmea as a standing force after it was recaptured from the Spartans in 379 BC, likely as defense against future attempts by foreign forces to take the citadel.

== Destruction and rebuilding ==
The Cadmea was destroyed in 335 BC by Alexander the Great, who razed the city of Thebes as a warning to other Greek cities contemplating revolt against his rule. Cassander, the Macedonian general who inherited the Greek territorial possessions of Alexander after his death, rebuilt the Cadmea in 316 BC.

== Alternative meaning of cadmea ==
Cadmea is also an ancient name for calamine or zinc carbonate. Combined with copper, it was used in ancient times for the production of brass, as mentioned, for instance, by the Roman author, Pliny the Elder. The element, cadmium (Cd), was, in 1817, first isolated from an impurity in calamine; hence, the name, cadmium.

== Excavation ==
The Cadmea was rediscovered by the Greek archaeologist Antonios Keramopoulos.
