= Gorgidas =

4th century BC Theban military commander, leader of the Sacred Band

Gorgidas (Ancient Greek: Γοργίδας) was the first known Theban military leader of the Sacred Band of Thebes around 378 BC.

Plutarch in his Life of Pelopidas mentions Gorgidas for the first time when the pro-Spartan polemarch Leontidas took over with a Spartan army and forced the pro-Athens aristocrats and supporters to leave Thebes for good in 382 BC. They later came back in 379–378 BC to take back their city and kill the tyrants. Also in Life of Pelopidas, Plutarch credits Gorgidas with the creation of the Sacred Band, which he dispersed at first throughout the front ranks of the regular infantry, with the idea that they would inspire valour. However, they were later arrayed by Pelopidas as a unit in order to make their gallantry more conspicuous.

== Cultural references ==
- In the Videssos Cycle by Harry Turtledove, there appears as a main character a Greek physician named Gorgidas, who has much in common with the men of the Sacred Band of Thebes.
- In the book My Fair Captain by J. L. Langley, the society mainly featured is based on and draws its roots from the Sacred Band of Thebes mentioning Gorgidas.
