= Boeotarch =

Title of the chief officers of the Boeotian Confederacy

Boeotarch (Greek: Βοιωτάρχης, Boiotarches) was the title of the chief officers of the Boeotian Confederacy, founded in 379 BC after a rebellion freed the cities of Boeotia from Spartan dominance. There were seven Boeotarchs, democratically elected from seven electoral districts throughout Boeotia. As the largest city of the region, Thebes generally elected four of the Boeotarchs, while the other three represented outlying districts. The number of Boeotarchs, however, may not have remained constant at seven. They may have not even represented districts in the same way as the earlier Boeotian League.

Failure to relinquish power was a capital offence. The function of the Boeotarchs were roughly equivalent to that of the Athenian strategos, acting as both political leaders and generals in battle. And indeed, many other political, military, and judicial offices in the Boeotian League were copied from the Athenian model. The Boeotians also had an archon, but unlike the Athenian archon, his duties were merely symbolic. The sole responsibility of the Boeotian archon was in lending his name to the name of the year, a practice borrowed from the Athenians.

The most famous individuals to hold the office were Epaminondas and Pelopidas, who led Thebes to hegemonic status over Greece in the middle of the 4th century BC ("Theban hegemony").

== See also ==
- Battle of Leuctra
- Sacred Band of Thebes
