= Archaeological Museum of Thebes =

Museum in Thebes, Greece

Coordinates: 38°19′25″N 23°19′4″E

The Archaeological Museum of Thebes is a museum in Thebes, Greece dedicated to the Boeotia region.

== History ==
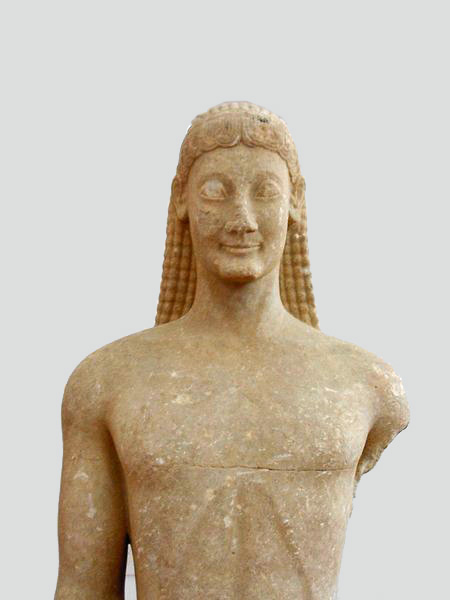
Statue of a kouros

The Archaeological Museum of Thebes was first built between 1905 and 1912 at the northern edge of the Cadmea hill. It consisted of a two-storey building with auxiliary facilities. During the occupation of Greece, it was closed and used as a barracks by the occupying forces. After the war, it did not reopen and was eventually demolished in the 1950s. A new building was constructed on the site and inaugurated in 1962, housing the collections in a single-storey building. The exhibition was arranged in four main galleries, as well as the entrance hall and museum garden, and was organized chronologically and thematically according to the types of artifacts.

In 2007, the museum was closed to the public for renovation. The new building was constructed between 2005 and 2010 on the same site, based on designs by architect Michalis Souvatzidis. The existing buildings were integrated around a central atrium, creating approximately 1,000 square metres of covered exhibition space. A further 1,390 square metres of semi-open space and 1,750 square metres of outdoor exhibition space were created for displaying antiquities that are not affected by weather conditions. The complex also includes administrative, conservation, design, storage and study facilities, as well as libraries. An archaeological excavation area open to visitors is located beneath the building.

Inside the museum, the medieval tower belonging to the fortifications of Thebes under Frankish rule was also conserved and opened to visitors. It was built in 1278 by Nicholas II of Saint-Omer.

The inauguration of the new building and its renovated collections took place on 7 June 2016, in the presence of the President of Greece and the Archbishop of Athens.

== Gallery ==
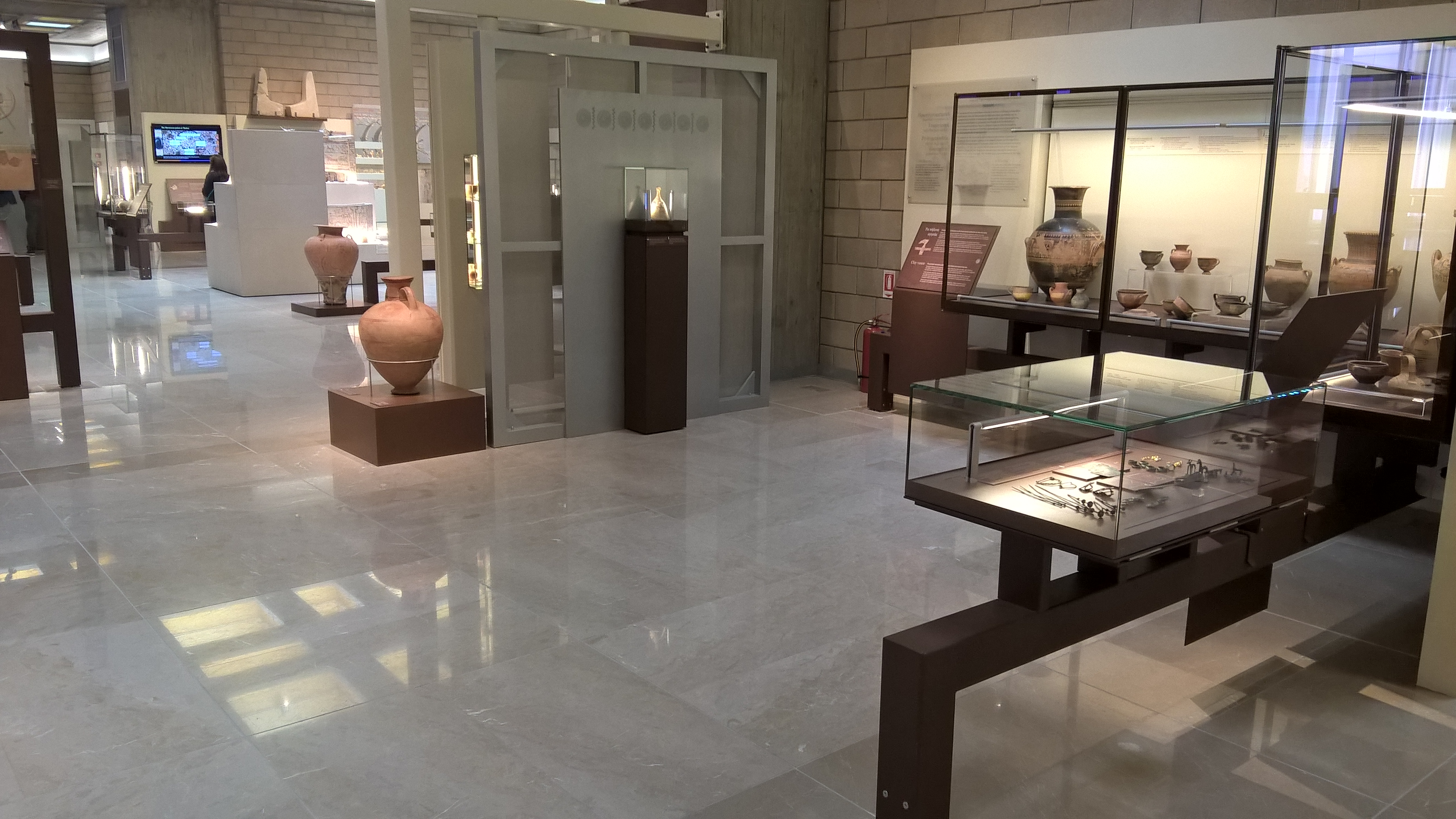

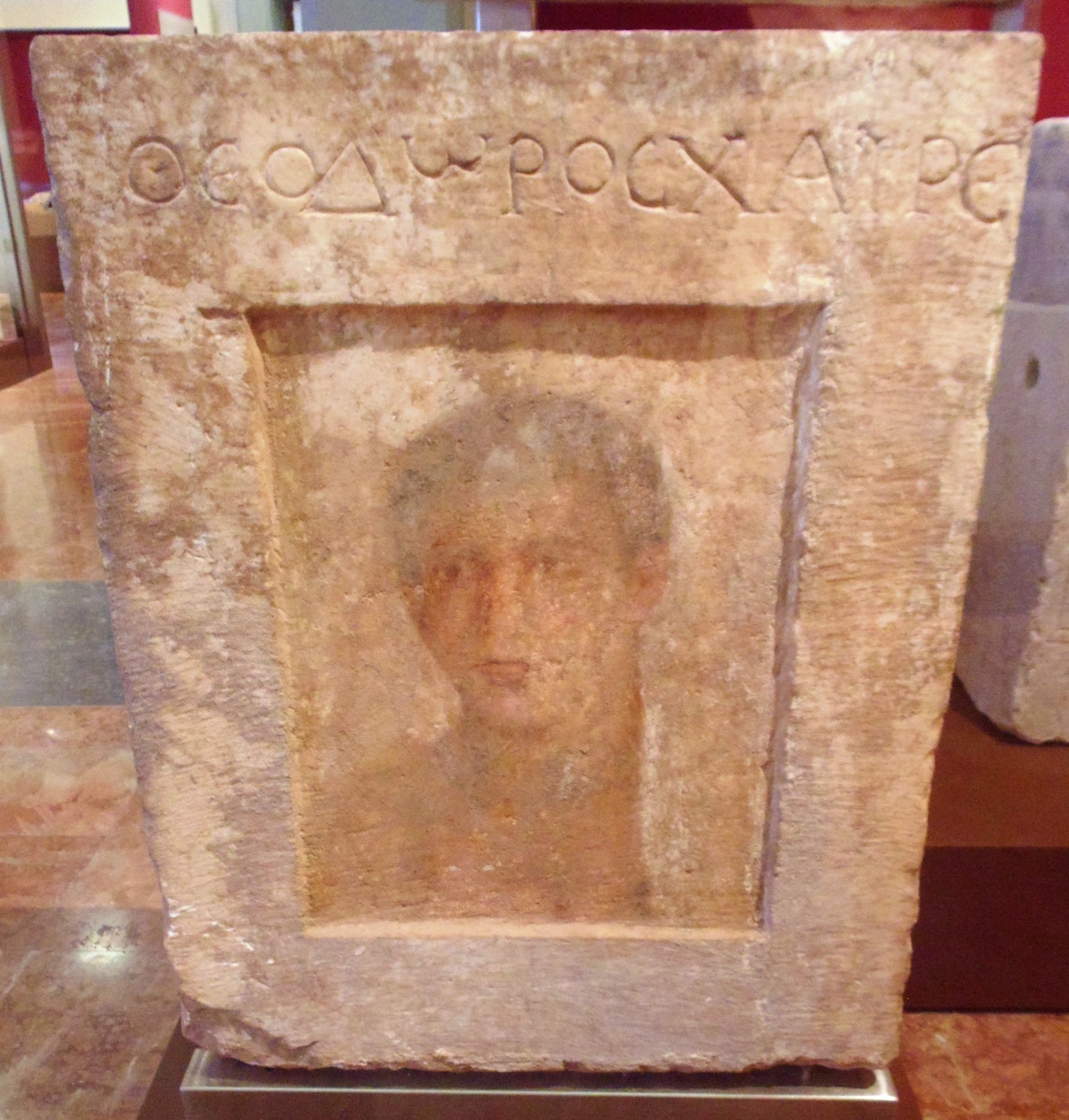

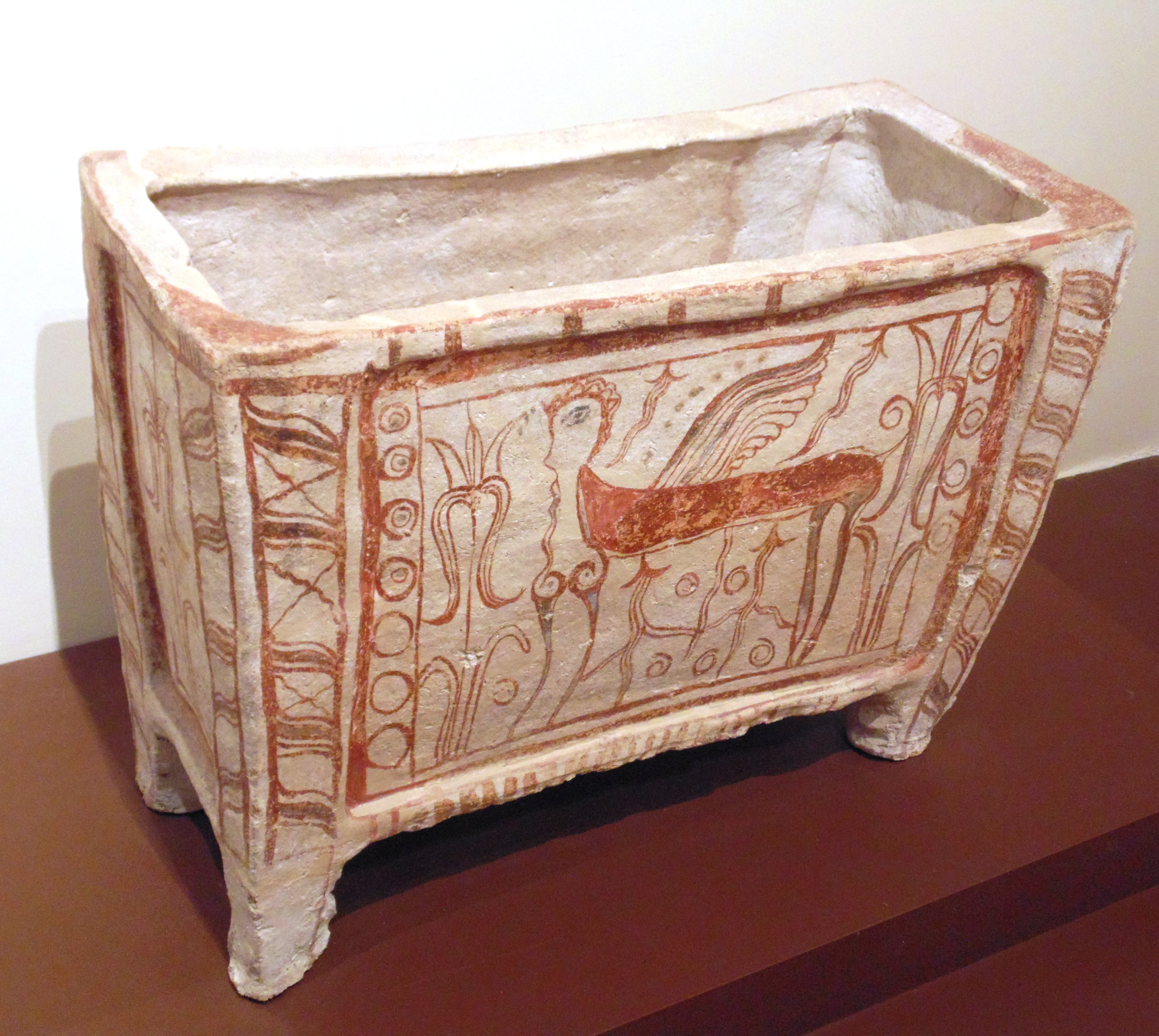

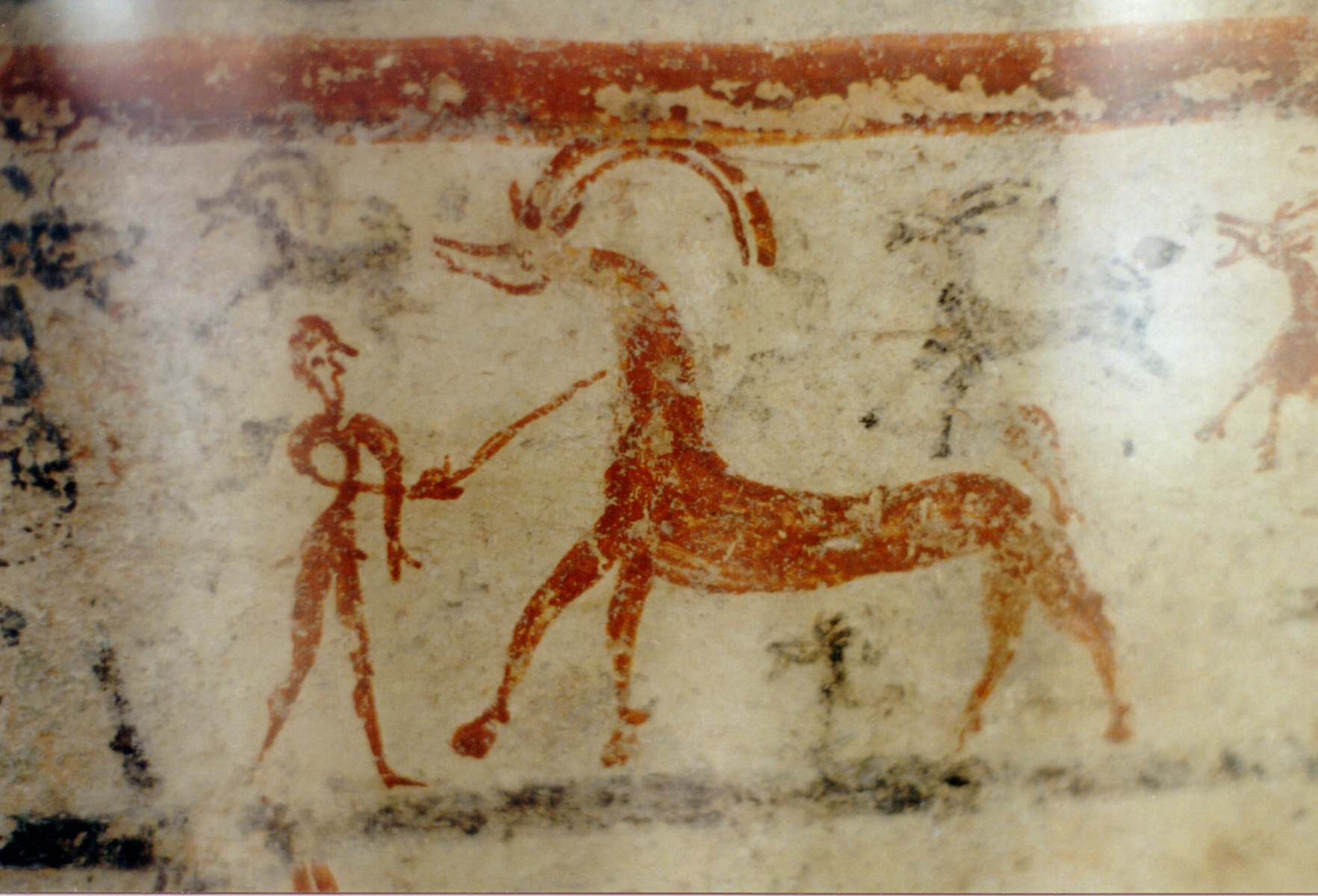

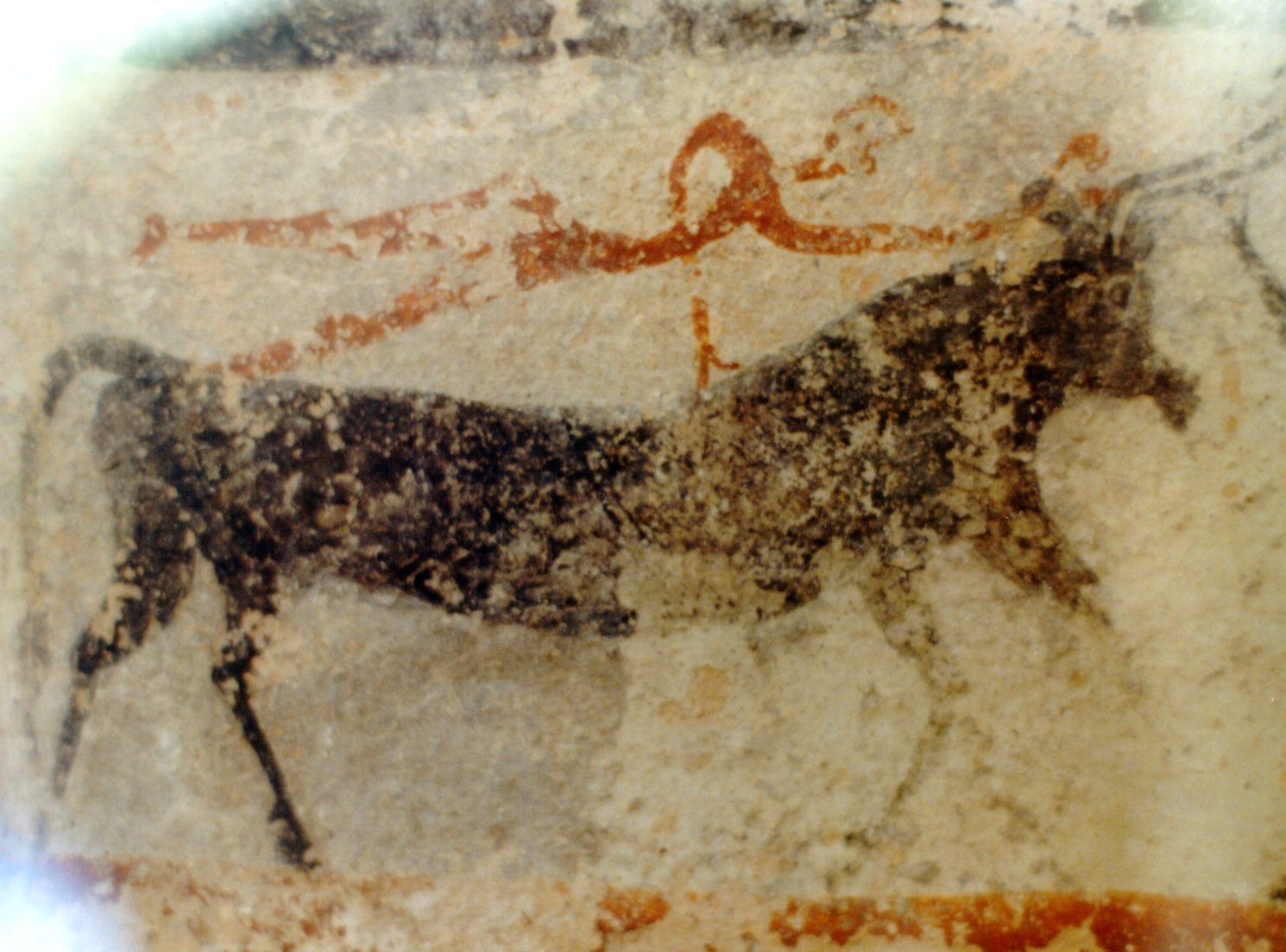

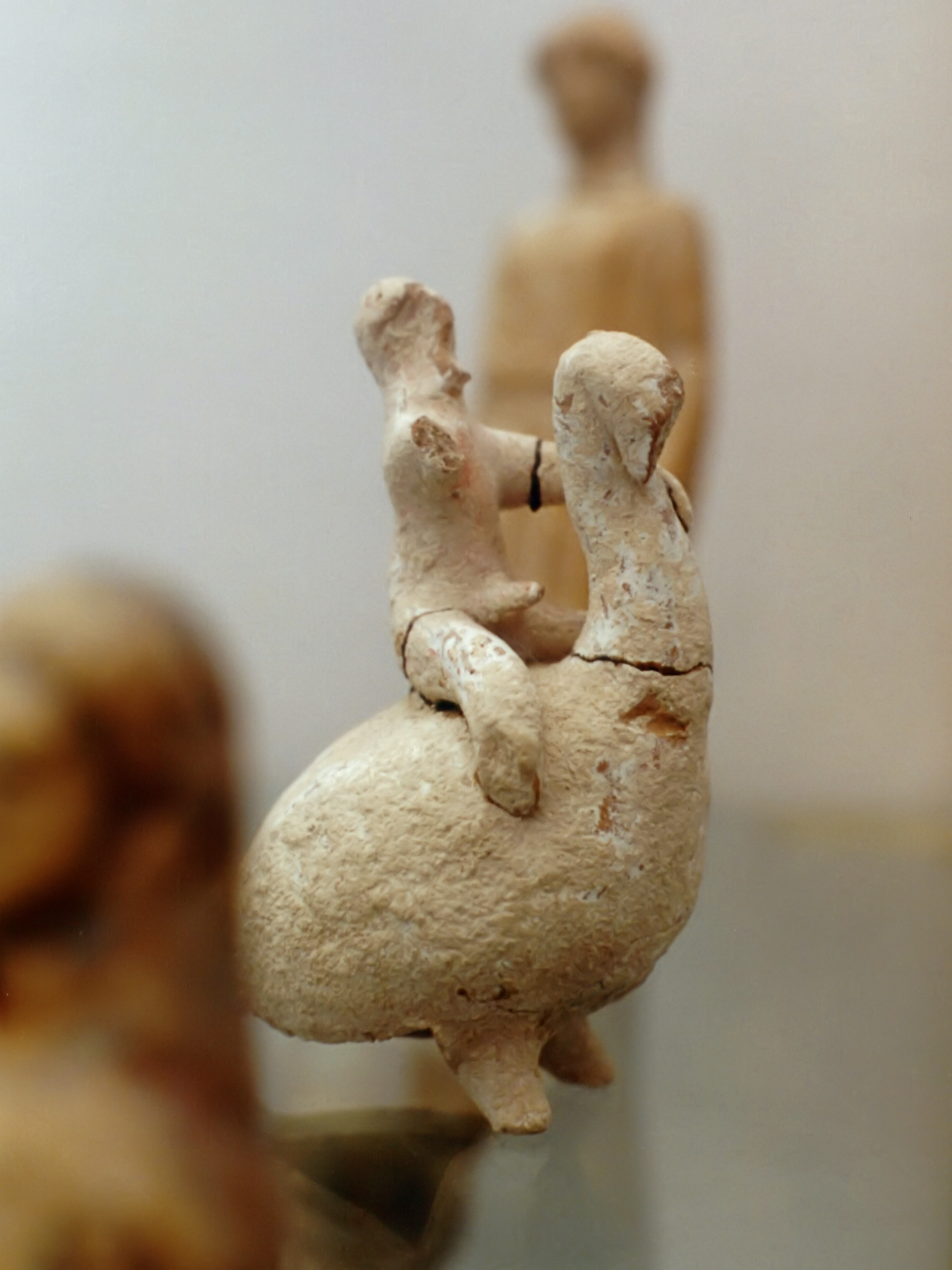

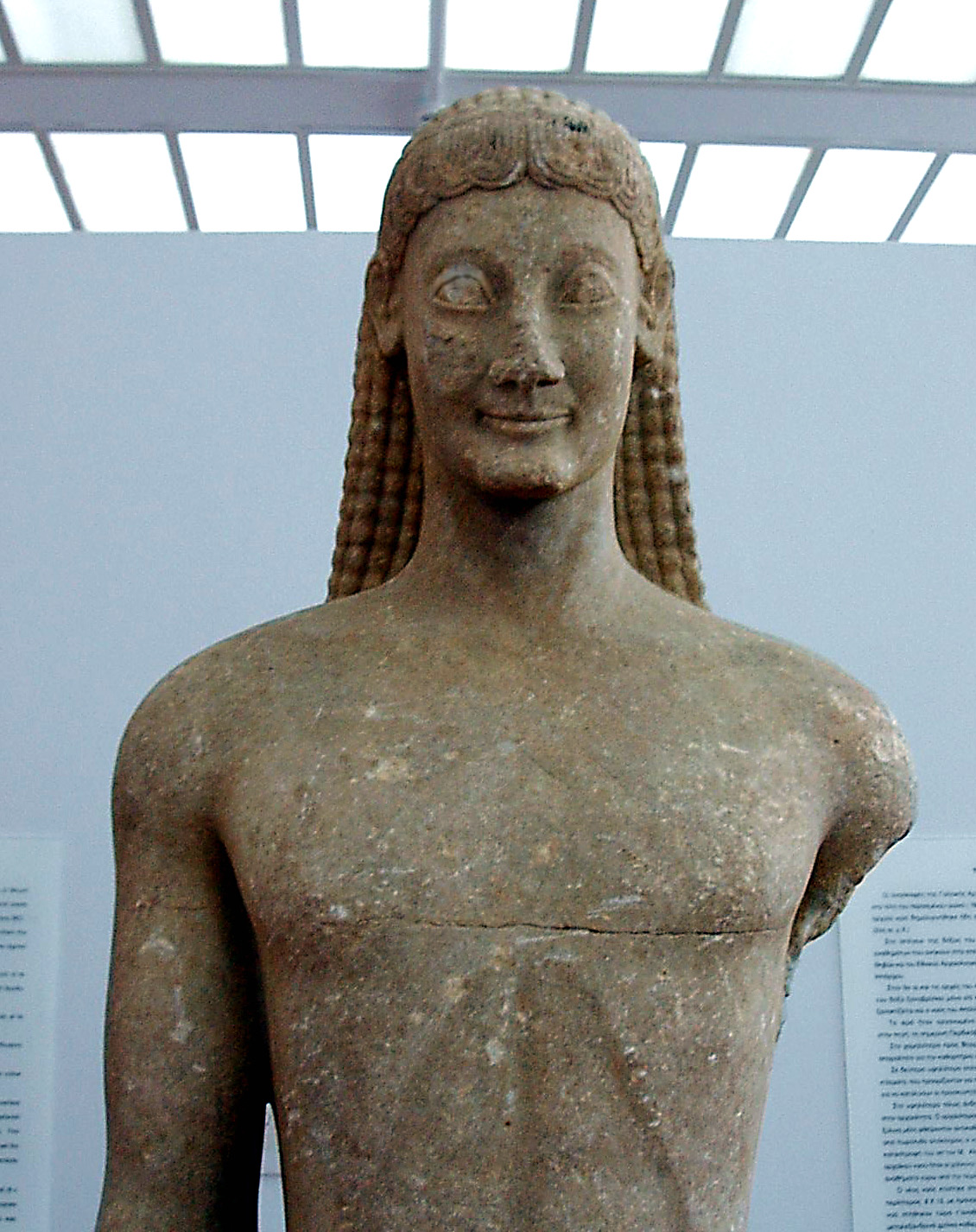

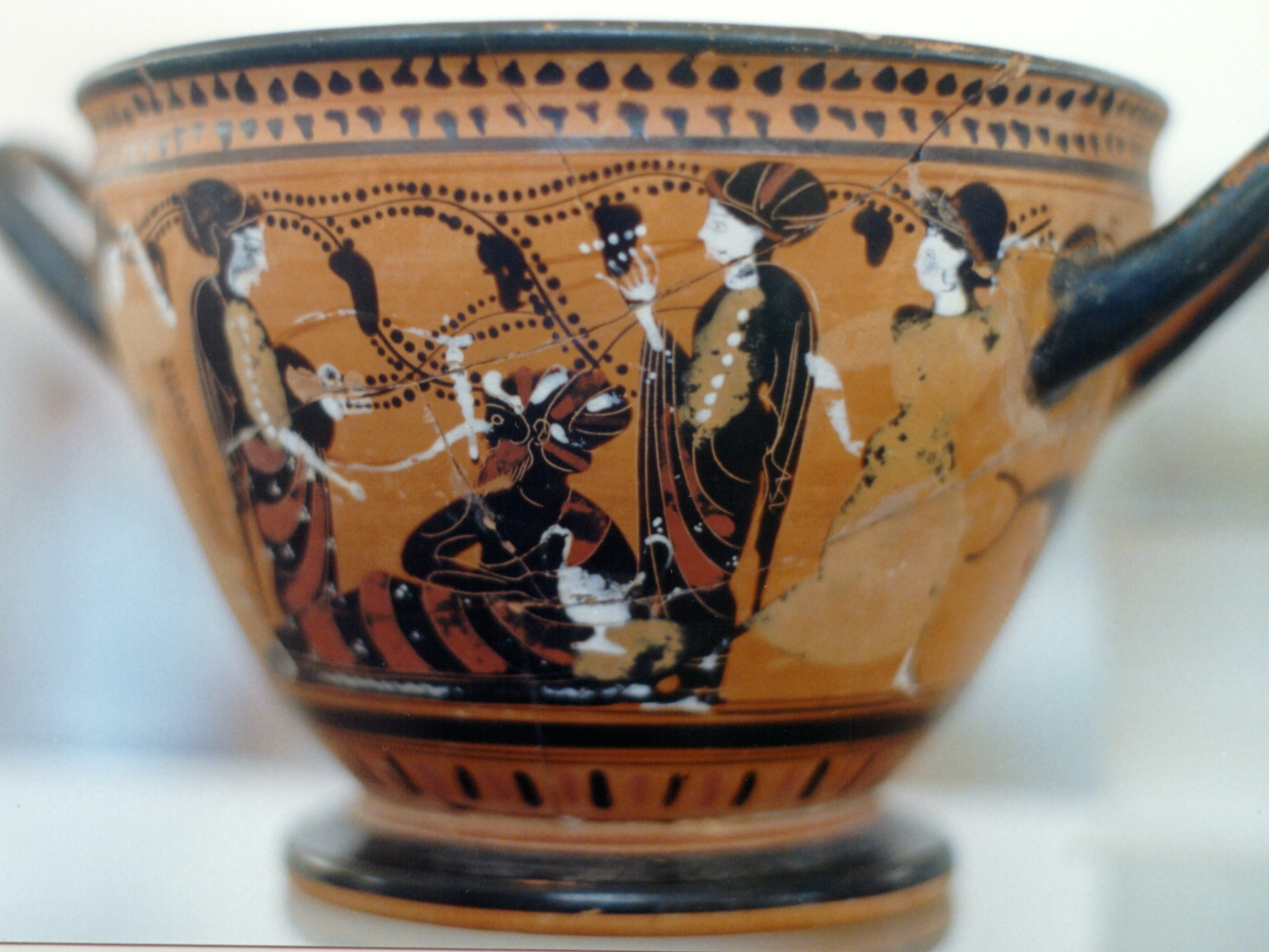

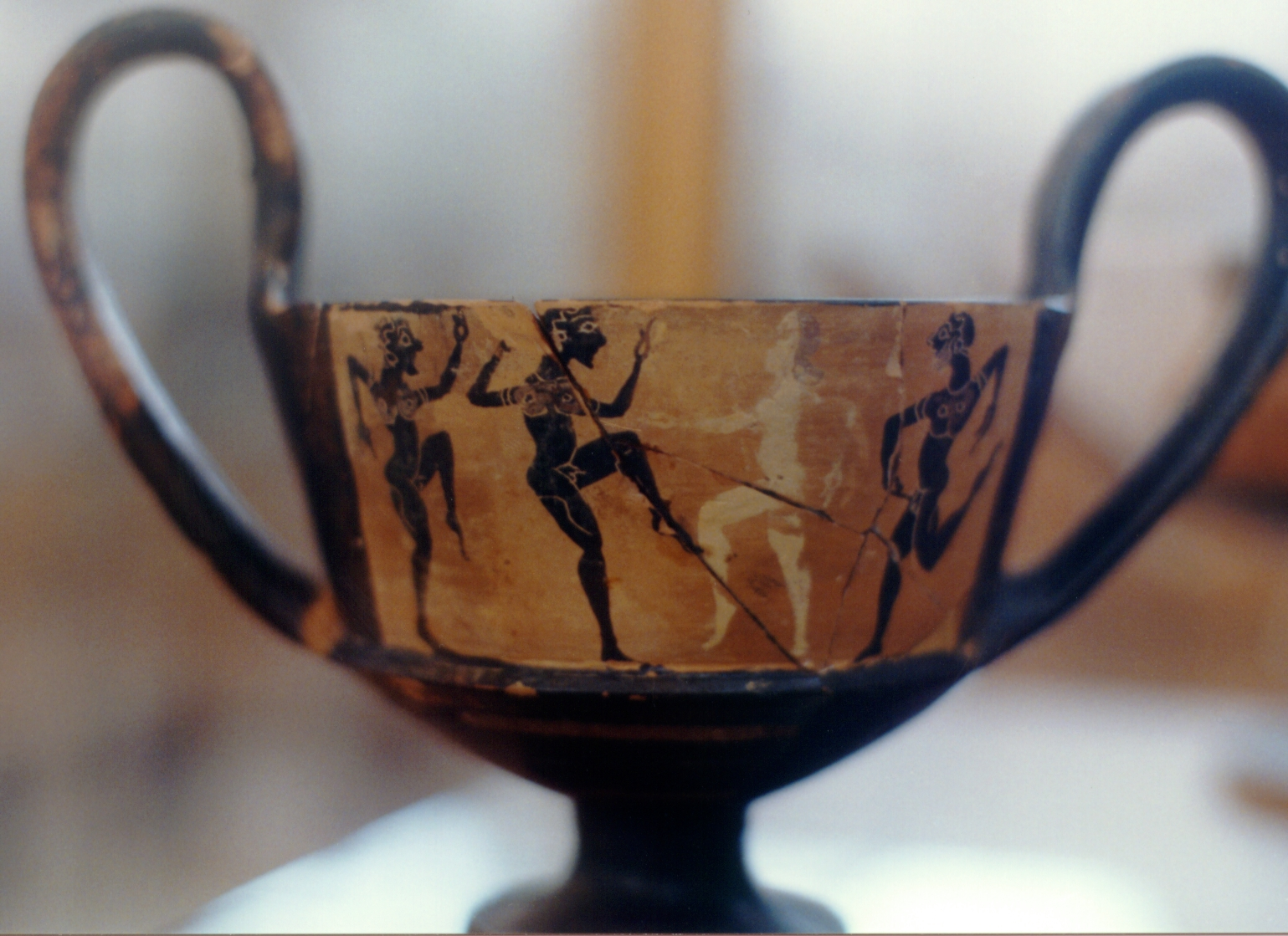

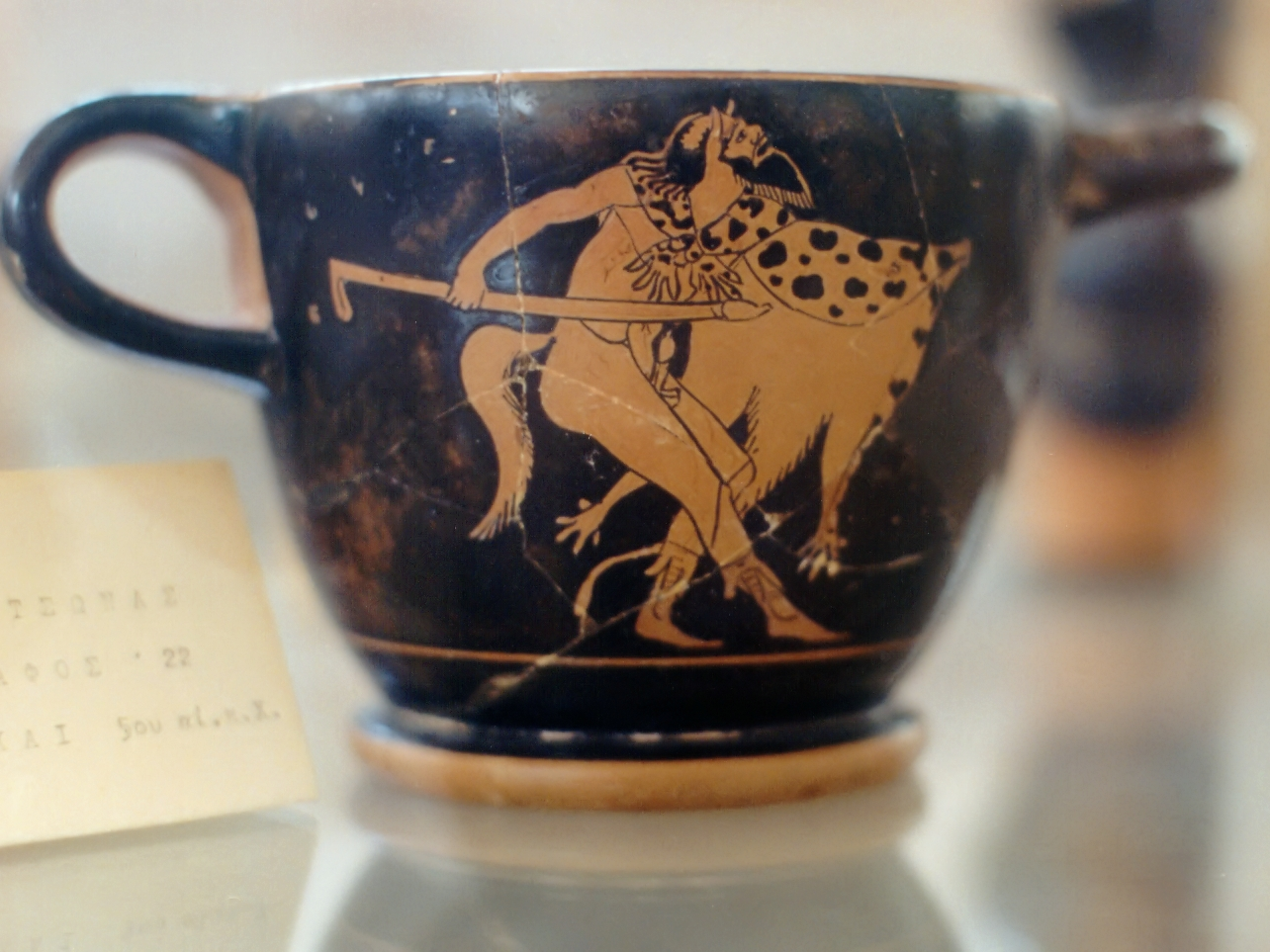

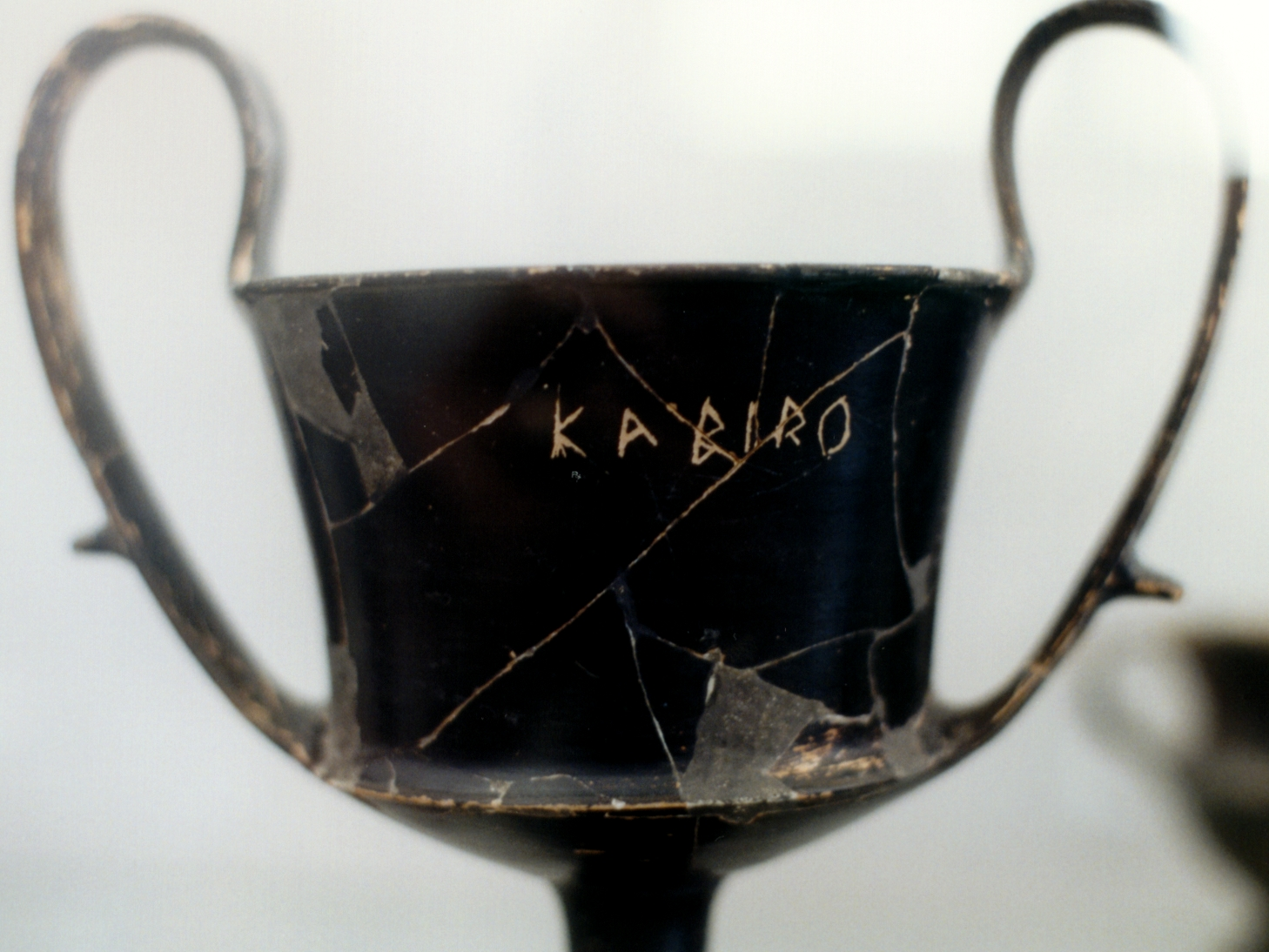

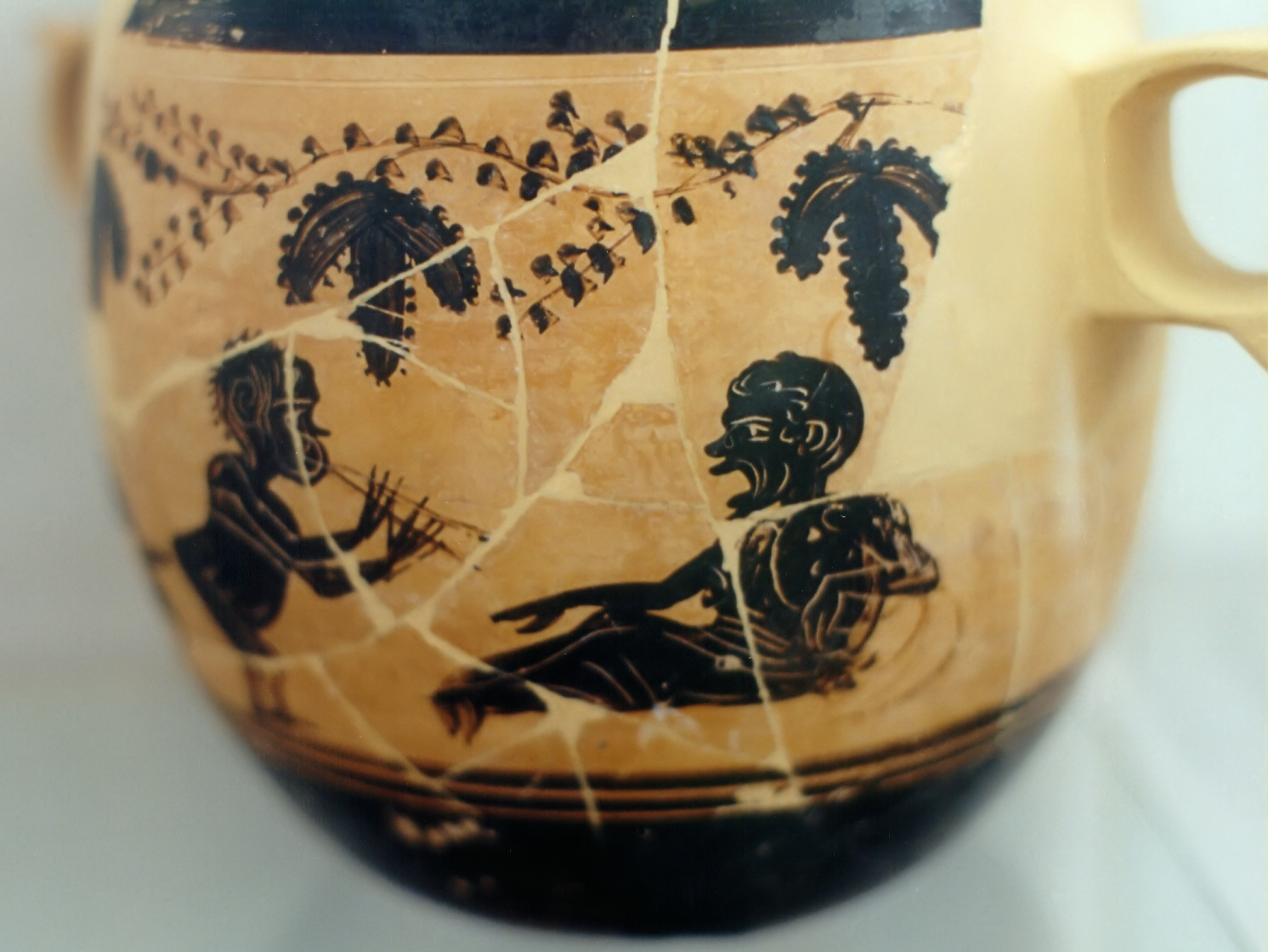

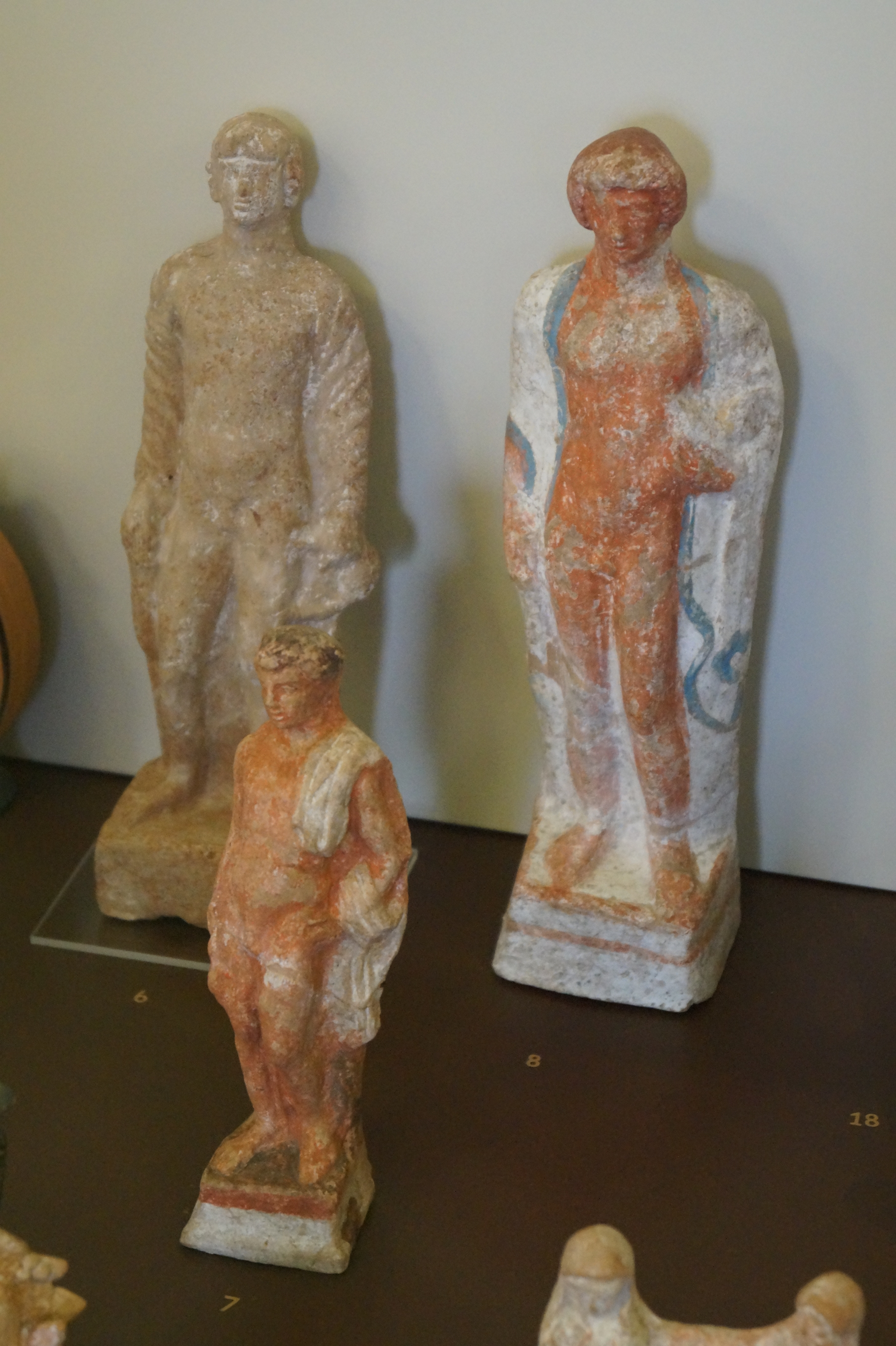

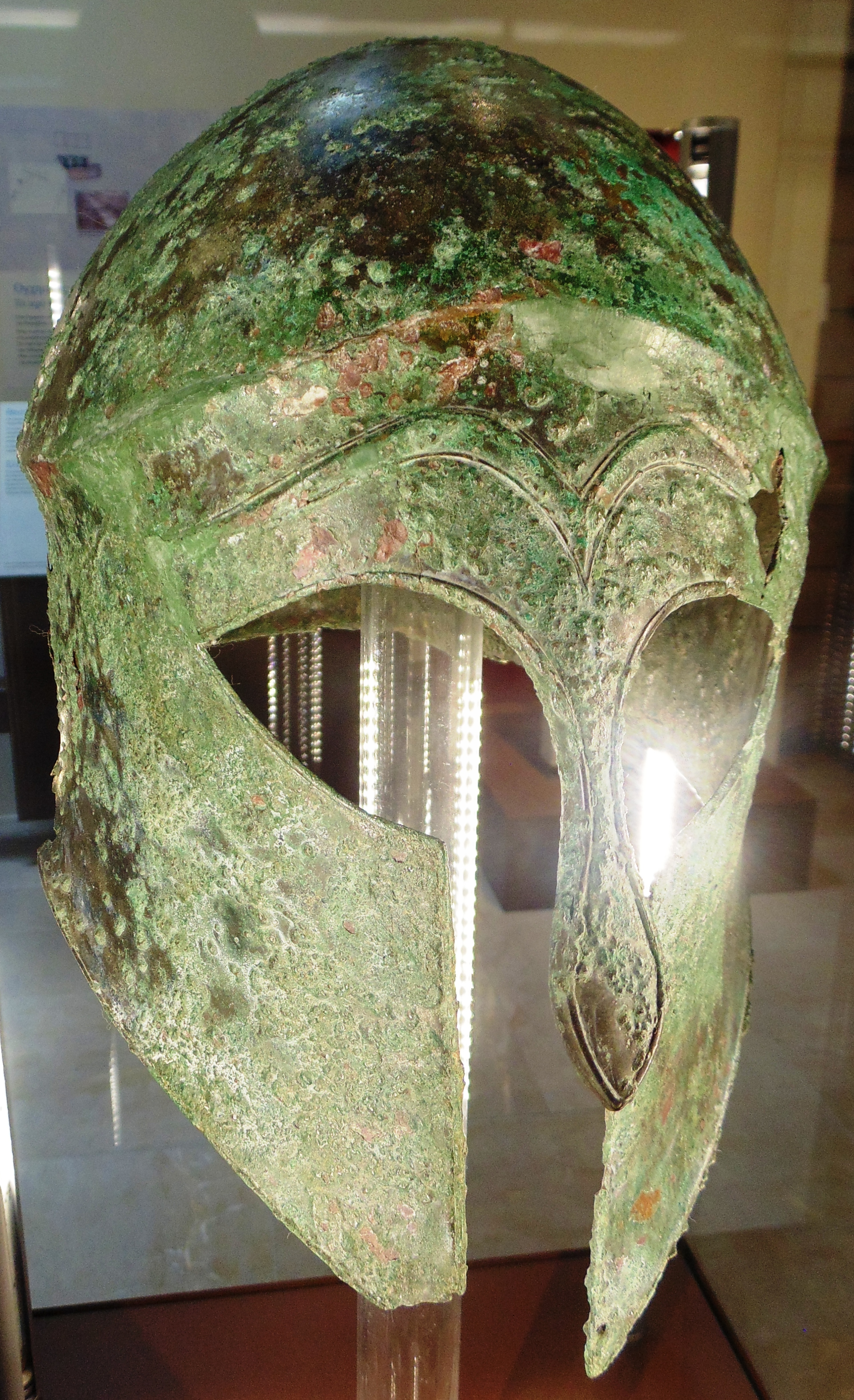

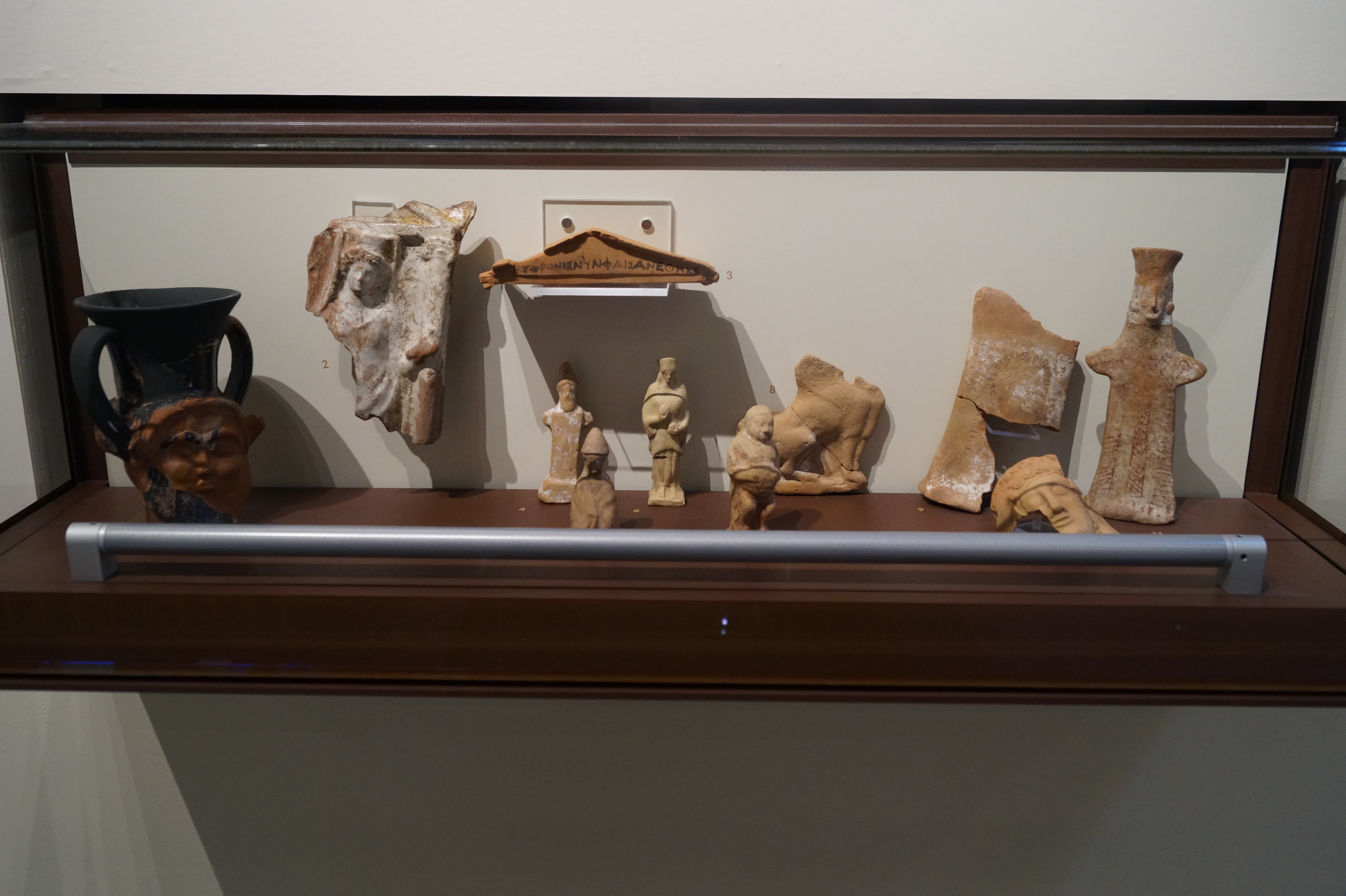

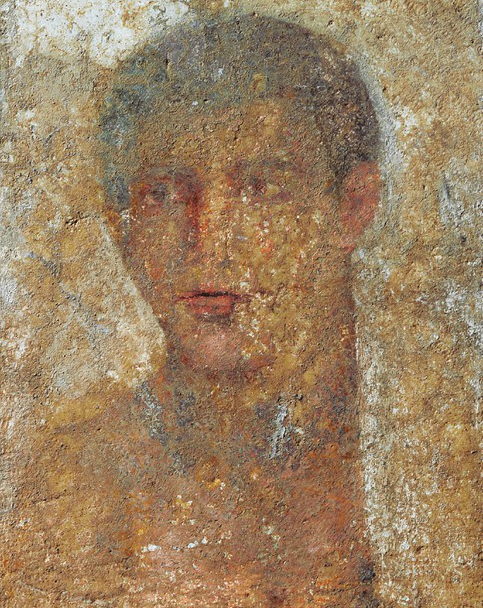
A Hellenistic Greek encaustic painting on a marble tombstone depicting the portrait of a young man named Theodoros, dated 1st century BC during the period of Roman Greece
