= Thebes, Greece =

City in Boeotia, Greece

Thebes Θήβα
- Municipality
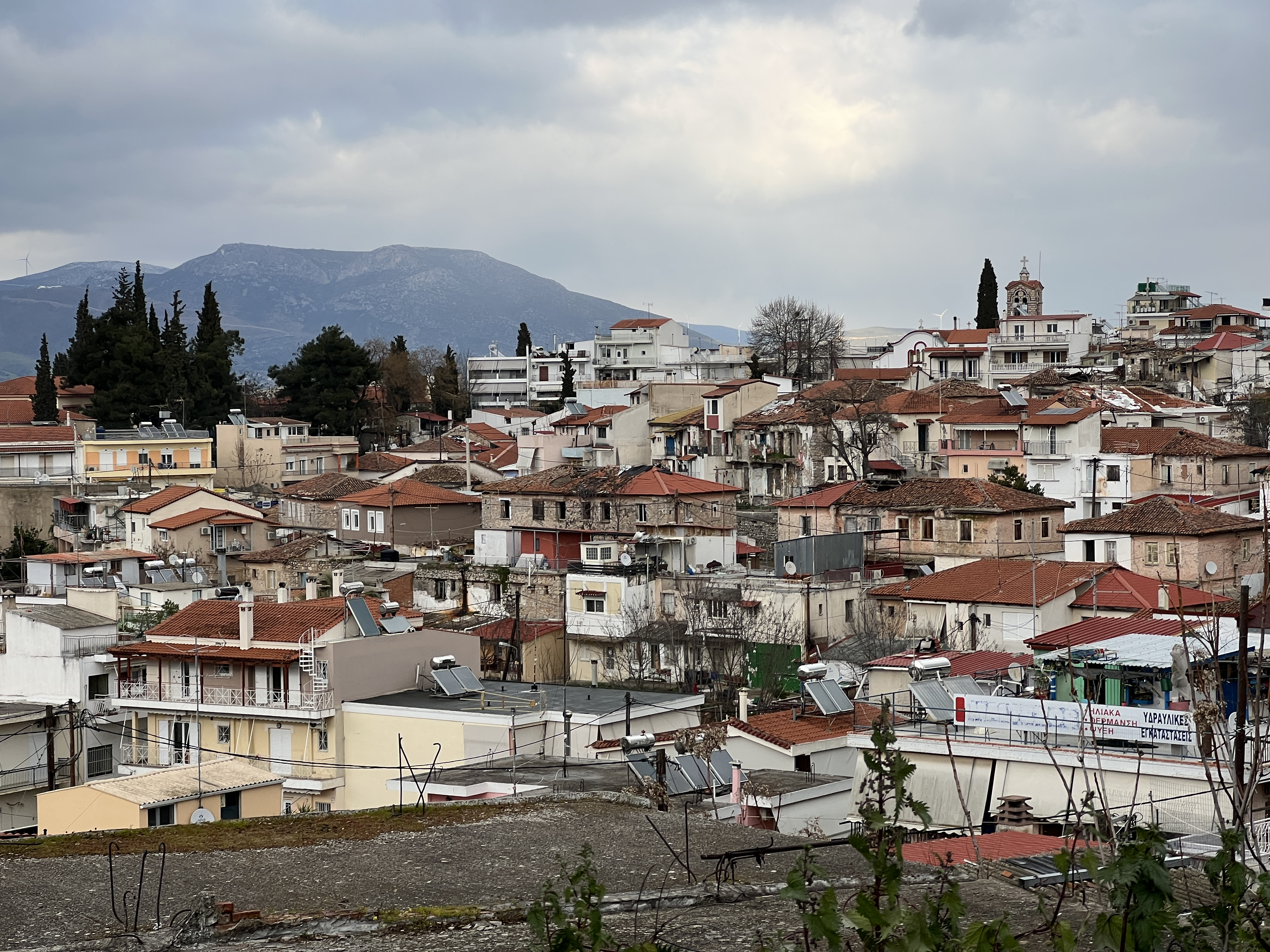
- View of Thebes

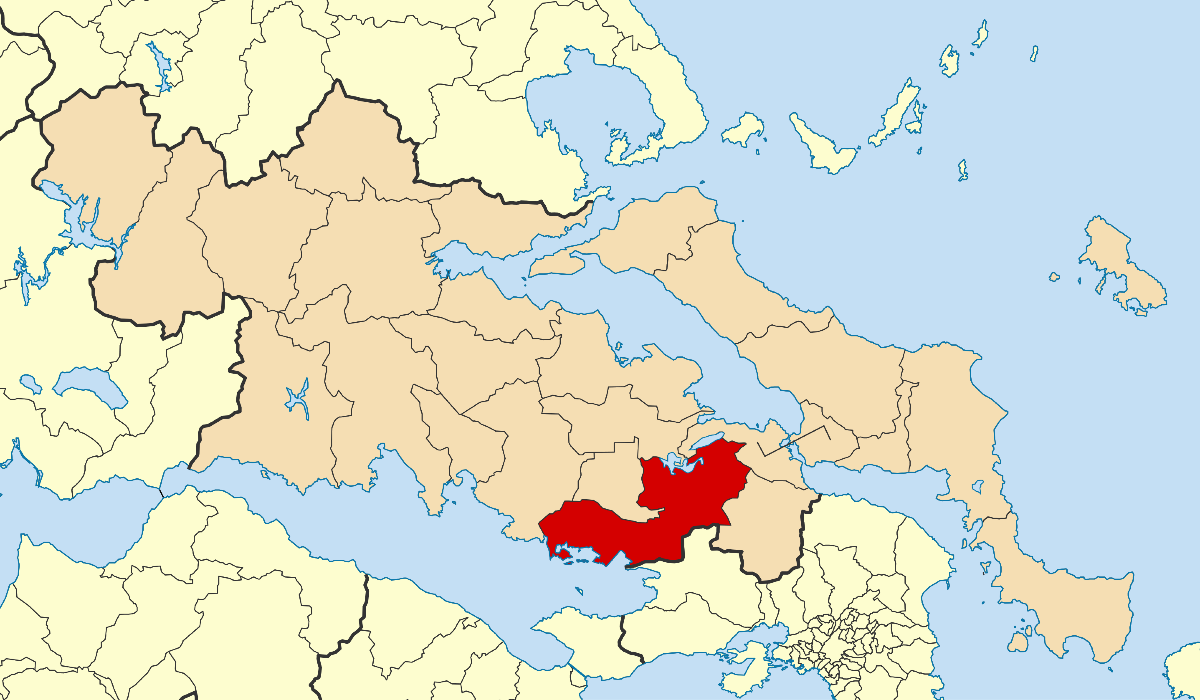

- Location within Greece
- Coordinates: 38°19′15″N 23°19′04″E
- Country: Greece
- Administrative region: Central Greece
- Regional unit: Boeotia

Area
  - Municipality: 830.112 km^{2} (320.508 sq mi)
  - Municipal unit: 321.015 km^{2} (123.945 sq mi)
  - Community: 143.889 km^{2} (55.556 sq mi)
- Elevation: 215 m (705 ft)

Population (2021)
  - Municipality: 32,410
  - Density: 39.04/km^{2} (101.1/sq mi)
  - Municipal unit: 23,930
  - Municipal unit density: 74.54/km^{2} (193.1/sq mi)
  - Community: 21,530
  - Community density: 149.6/km^{2} (387.5/sq mi)
- Demonym: Theban
- Time zone: UTC+2 (EET)
  - Summer (DST): UTC+3 (EEST)
- Postal code: 32200
- Area code: 22620
- Website: www.thiva.gr

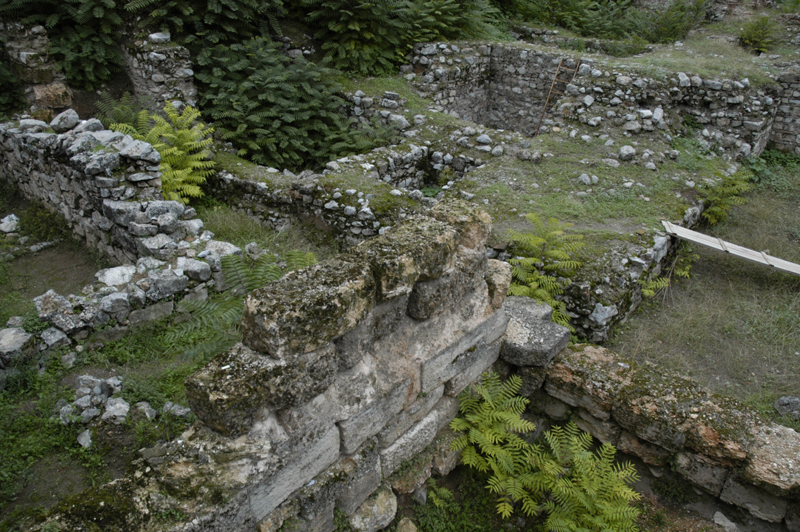
Remains of the Cadmea, the central fortress of ancient Thebes

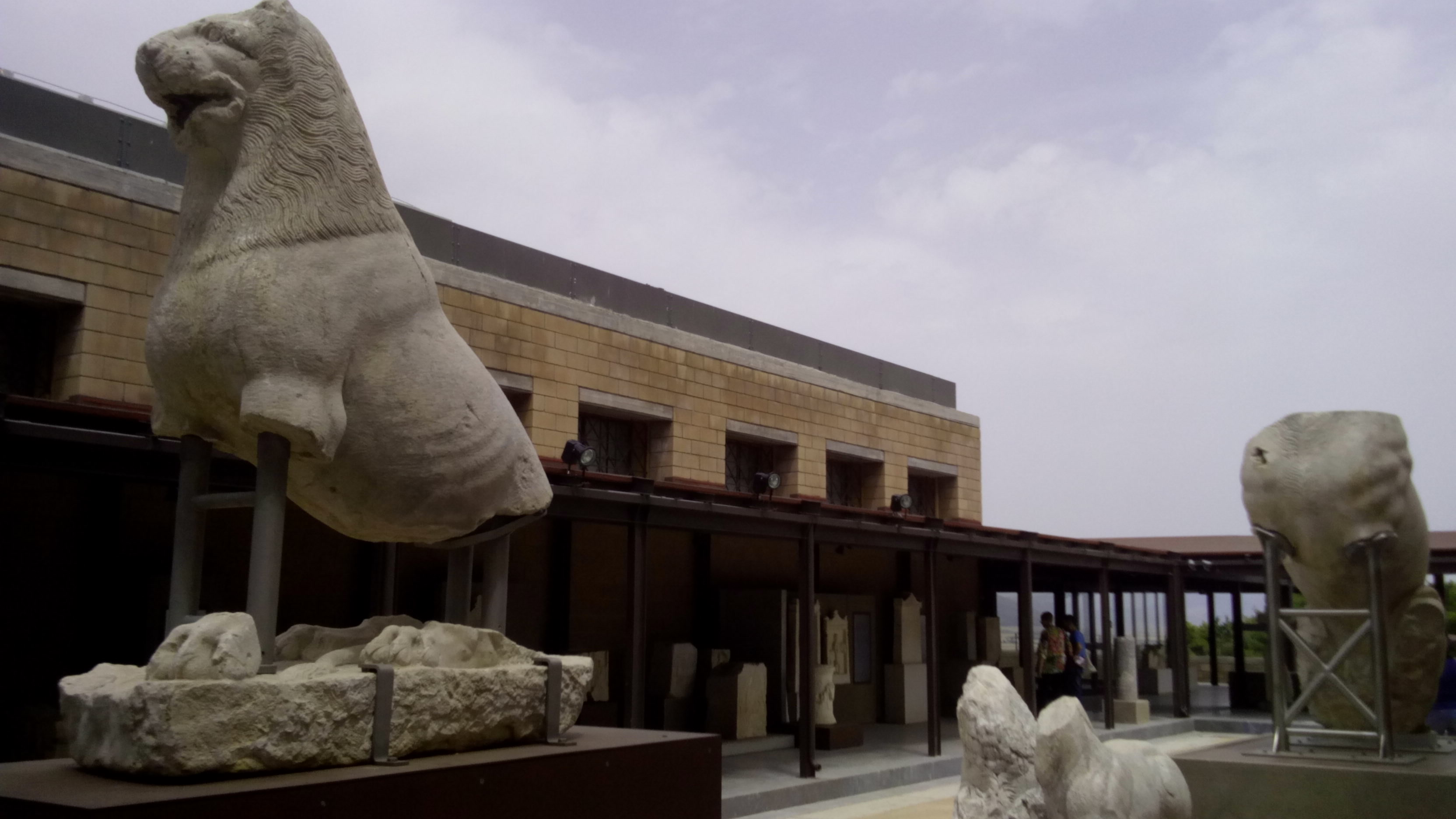
Archeological museum of Thebes

Thebes (/ˈθiːbz/ THEEBZ; Greek: Θήβα, Thíva [ˈθiva]; Ancient Greek: Θῆβαι, Thêbai [tʰɛ̂ːbai̯]) is a city in Boeotia, Central Greece, and one of the oldest continuously inhabited cities in the world. It is the largest city in Boeotia and a major center for the region.

Ancient Thebes was the largest and leading polis of the Boeotian League. It sided with the Persians during the 480 BC invasion under Xerxes I. Theban forces under the command of Epaminondas defeated Spartans at the Battle of Leuctra in 371 BC, giving rise to a short-lived Theban hegemony. In 338 BC, Macedon defeated an alliance of Thebes and Athens at the Battle of Chaeronea, and later Thebes was destroyed by Alexander the Great in 335 BC.

During the Byzantine period, the city was famous for its silks. The modern city contains an archaeological museum, the remains of the Cadmea (Bronze Age and forward citadel), and scattered ancient remains. The Holy Church of Luke the Evangelist is also in Thebes and contains Luke's tomb and relics.

== Municipality ==
In 2011, as a consequence of the Kallikratis reform, Thebes was merged with Plataies, Thisvi, and Vagia to form a larger municipality, which retained the name Thebes. The other three became units of the larger municipality.

== History ==
=== Ancient Thebes ===
==== Mythology ====
It played an important role in Greek mythology, as the site of the stories of Cadmus, Oedipus, Dionysus, Heracles and others. One myth had the city founded by Agenor, which gave rise to the (now somewhat obscure) name "Agenorids" to denote Thebans.

==== Early history ====
Archaeological excavations in and around Thebes have revealed a Mycenaean settlement and clay tablets written in the Linear B script, indicating the importance of the site in the Bronze Age. Archaeological excavations in and around Thebes have revealed cist graves dated to Mycenaean times containing weapons, ivory, and tablets written in Linear B. Its attested name forms and relevant terms on tablets found locally or elsewhere include 𐀳𐀣𐀂, te-qa-i, (Note: Found on the TH Ft 140 tablet.) understood to be read as *Tʰēgʷai̮s (Ancient Greek: Θήβαις, Thēbais, i.e. "at Thebes", Thebes in the dative-locative case), 𐀳𐀣𐀆, te-qa-de, (Note: Found on the MY X 508, TH Wu 65, tablets.) for *Tʰēgʷasde (Θήβασδε, Thēbasde, i.e. "to Thebes"), and 𐀳𐀣𐀊, te-qa-ja, (Note: Found on the KN Ap 5864, PY Ep 539, tablets.) for *Tʰēgʷaja (Θηβαία, Thēbaia, i.e. "Theban woman").

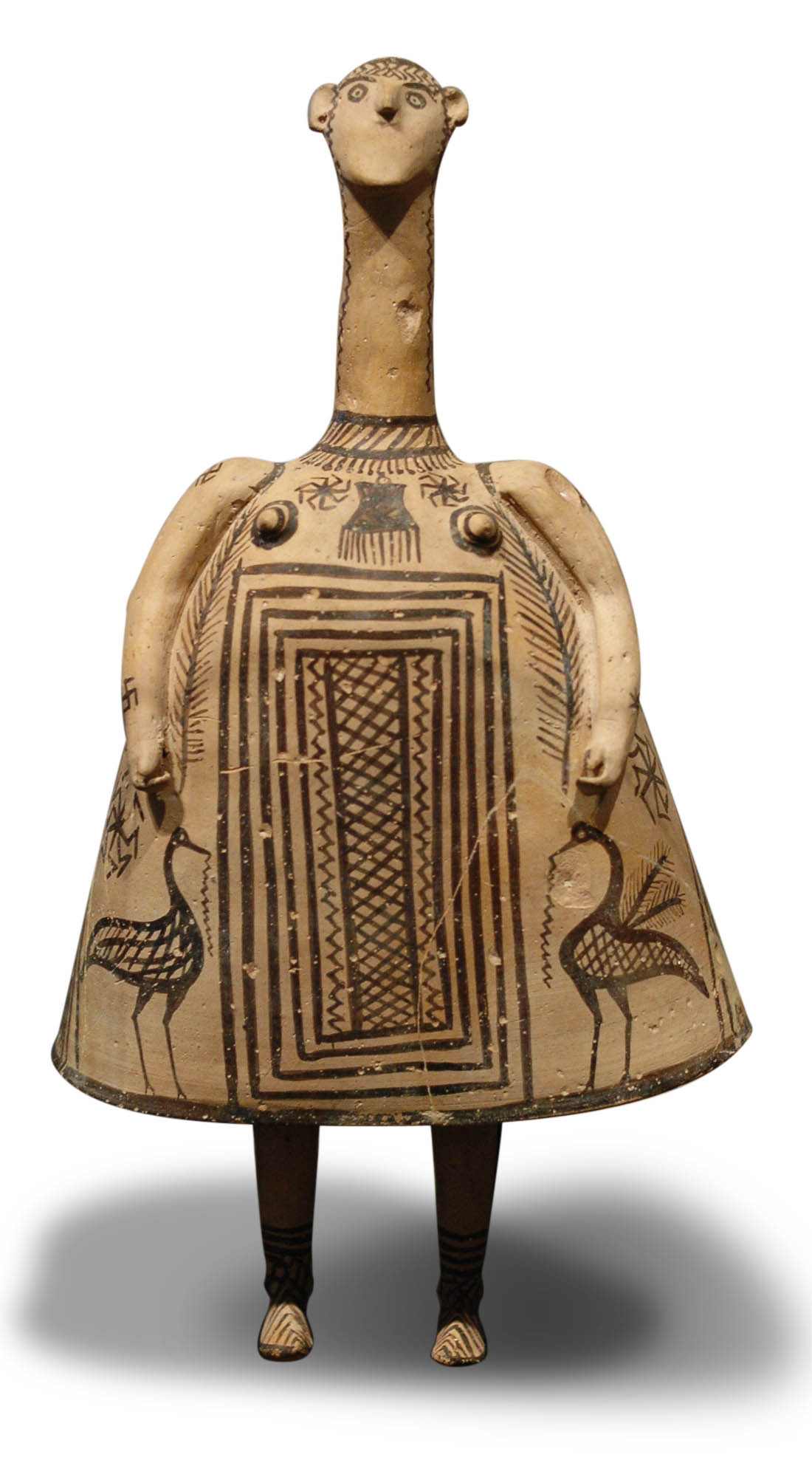
Theban workshop (Oinochoe type), 7th century BC

*Tʰēgʷai was one of the first Greek communities to be drawn together within a fortified city, and that it owed its importance in prehistoric days—as later—to its military strength. Deger-Jalkotzy claimed that the statue base from Kom el-Hetan in Amenhotep III's kingdom (LHIIIA:1) mentions a name similar to Thebes, spelled out quasi-syllabically in hieroglyphs as dy-qꜣj-jꜣ-s, and considered to be one of four tj-n3-jj (Danaan?) kingdoms worthy of note (alongside Knossos and Mycenae). *Tʰēgʷai in LHIIIB lost contact with Egypt but gained it with "Miletus" (Hittite: Milawata) and "Cyprus" (Hittite: Alashija). In the late LHIIIB, according to Palaima, *Tʰēgʷai was able to pull resources from Lamos near Mount Helicon, and from Karystos and Amarynthos on the Greek side of the isle of Euboia.

The central area of Thebes, known as the Cadmea, shows signs of destruction towards the end of the Mycenaean era and much of the site was abandoned. In the words of Richard Hope Simpson, "The decline of Thebes after the end of the LH IIIB period recalls the Hypothebai (or "sub-Thebes") of the Homeric Catalogue of the Ships (Iliad ii 505), but no reliable indications currently exist as to where this residual "lower town" may have been located." The Homeric Hypothebai may have been the seed of the Archaic and Classical polity of Thebes when the city was reestablished in earnest.

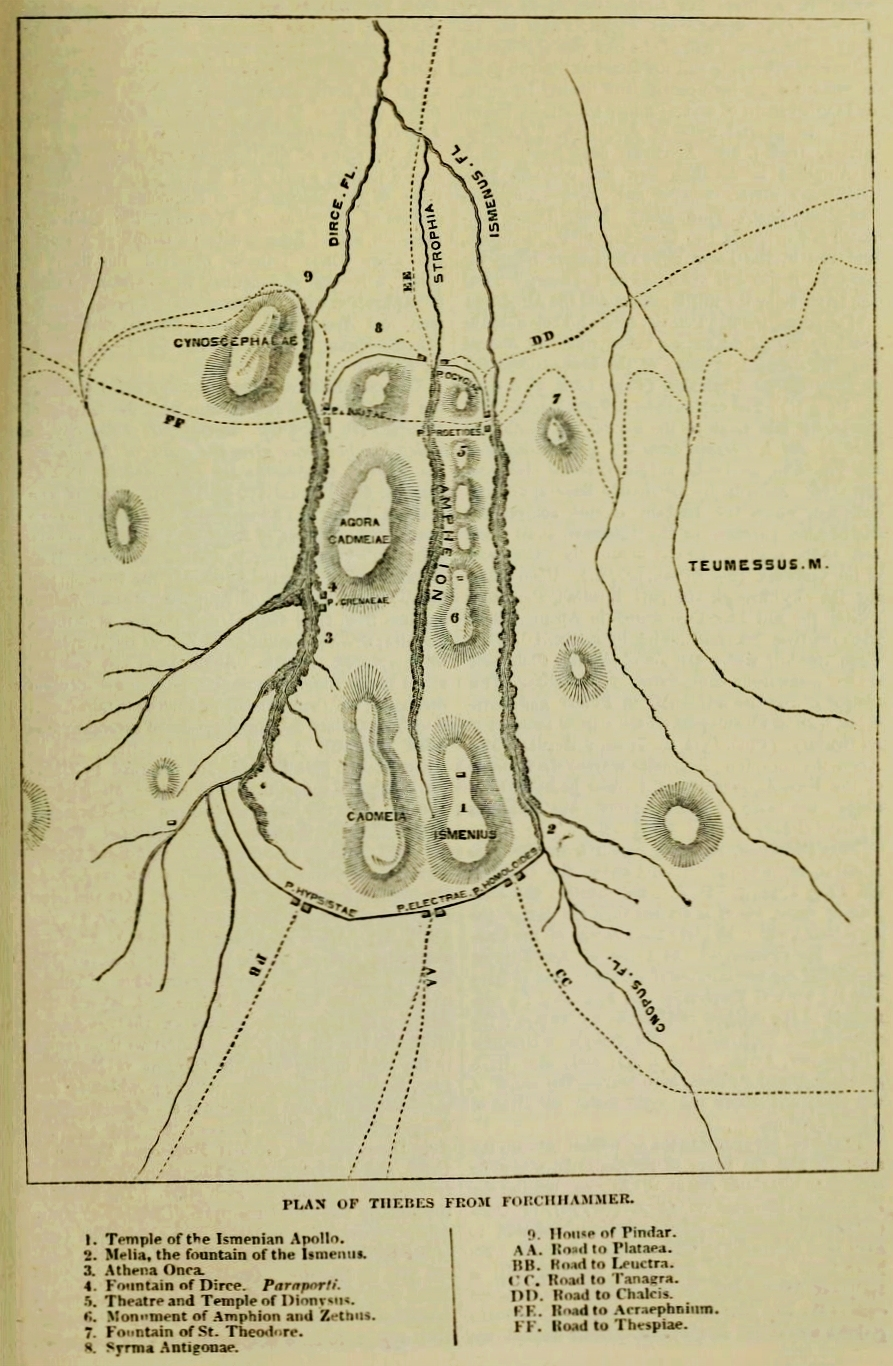
Topographic map of ancient Thebes

As attested already in Homer's Iliad, Thebes was often called "Seven-Gated Thebes" (Θῆβαι ἑπτάπυλοι, Thebai heptapyloi) (Iliad, IV.406) to distinguish it from "Hundred-Gated Thebes" (Θῆβαι ἑκατόμπυλοι, Thebai hekatompyloi) in Egypt (Iliad, IX.383).

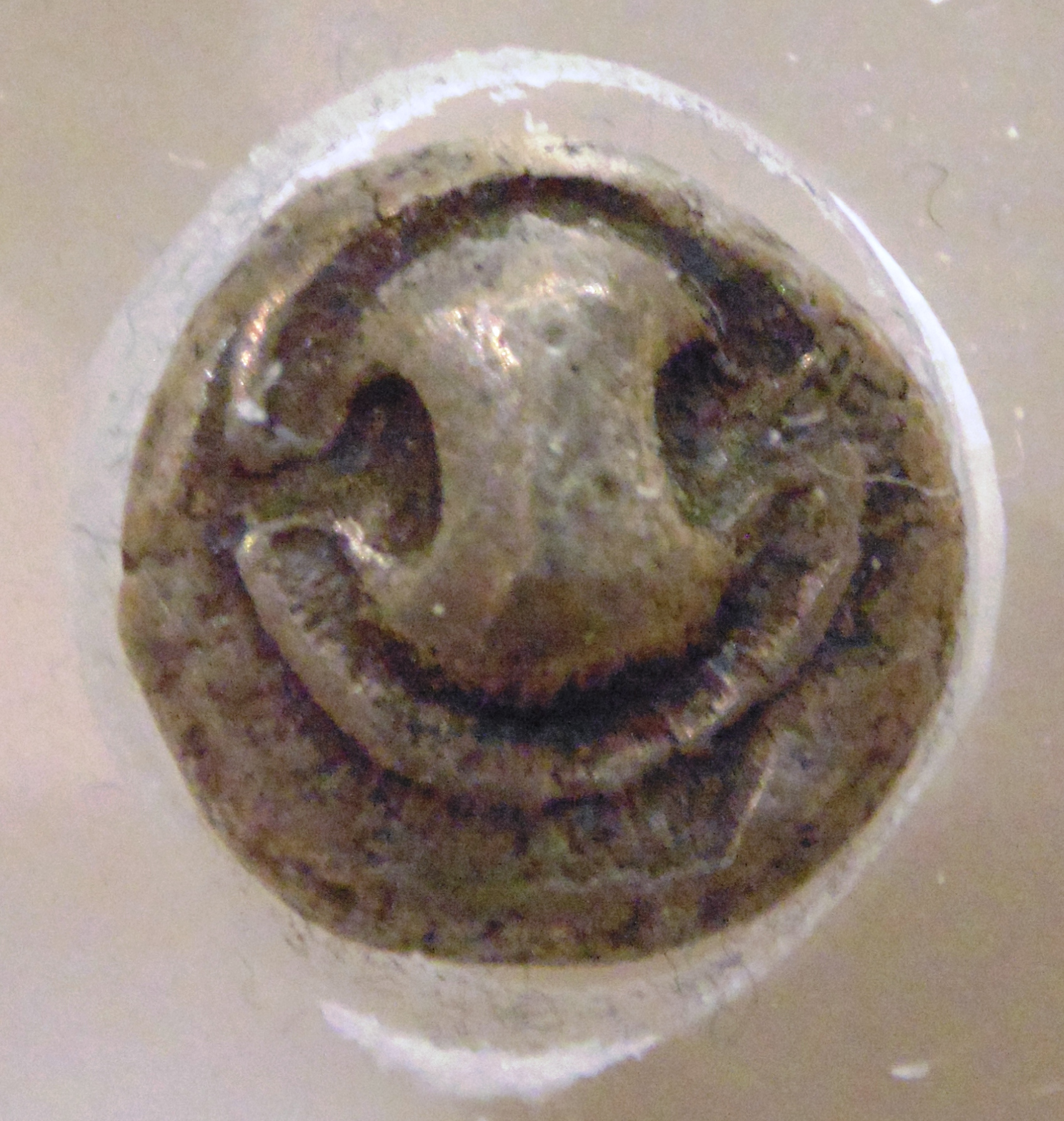
Ancient coin depicting a Boeotian shield, Archaeological Museum of Thebes

==== Greco-Persian and Peloponnesian Wars ====
In the late 6th century BC, the Thebans were brought for the first time into hostile contact with the Athenians, who helped the small village of Plataea to maintain its independence against them, and in 506 BC repelled an inroad into Attica. The aversion to Athens best serves to explain the apparently unpatriotic attitude which Thebes displayed during the Persian invasion of Greece (480–479 BC). Though a contingent of 400 was sent to Thermopylae and remained there with Leonidas before being defeated alongside the Spartans, the governing aristocracy soon after joined King Xerxes I of Persia with great readiness and fought zealously on his behalf at the Battle of Plataea in 479 BC. The victorious Greeks subsequently punished Thebes by depriving it of the presidency of the Boeotian League and an attempt by the Spartans to expel it from the Delphic amphictyony was only frustrated by the intercession of Athens.

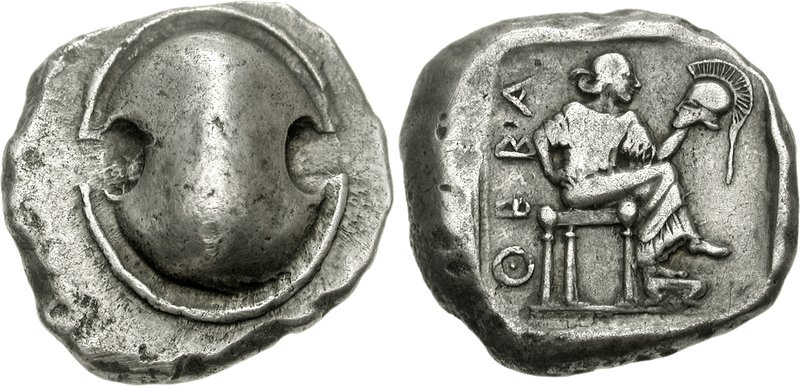
Thebes silver stater (450–440 BC) portraying Harmonia

In 457 BC Sparta, needing a counterpoise against Athens in central Greece, reversed her policy and reinstated Thebes as the dominant power in Boeotia. The great citadel of Cadmea served this purpose well by holding out as a base of resistance when the Athenians overran and occupied the rest of the country (457–447 BC). In the Peloponnesian War, the Thebans, embittered by the support that Athens gave to the smaller Boeotian towns, and especially to Plataea, which they vainly attempted to reduce in 431 BC, were firm allies of Sparta, which in turn helped them to besiege Plataea and allowed them to destroy the town after its capture in 427 BC. In 424 BC, at the head of the Boeotian levy, they inflicted a severe defeat on an invading force of Athenians at the Battle of Delium, and for the first time displayed the effects of that firm military organization that eventually raised them to predominant power in Greece.

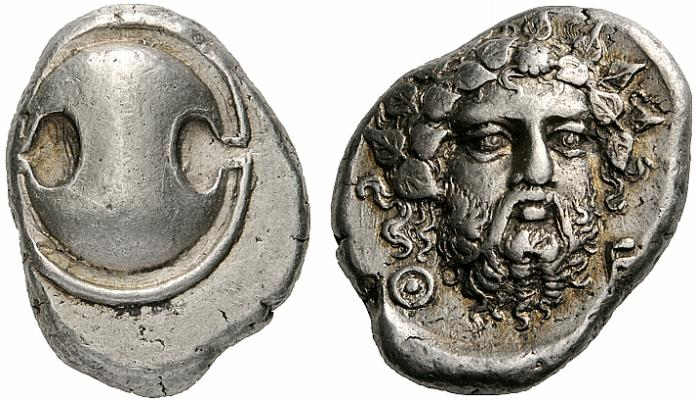
Silver stater of Thebes (405–395 BC). Obverse: Boeotian shield, reverse: Head of bearded Dionysus.

==== War against Sparta ====
After the downfall of Athens at the end of the Peloponnesian War, the Thebans, having learned that Sparta intended to protect the states that Thebes desired to annex, broke off the alliance. In 404 BC, they had urged the complete destruction of Athens; yet, in 403 BC, they secretly supported the restoration of its democracy in order to find in it a counterpoise against Sparta. A few years later, influenced perhaps in part by Persian gold, they formed the nucleus of the league against Sparta. At the Battle of Haliartus (395 BC) and the Battle of Coronea (394 BC), they again proved their rising military capacity by standing their ground against the Spartans. The result of the war was especially disastrous to Thebes, as the general settlement of 387 BC stipulated the complete autonomy of all Greek towns and so withdrew the other Boeotians from its political control. Its power was further curtailed in 382 BC, when a Spartan force occupied the citadel by a treacherous coup de main.

=== Theban hegemony ===
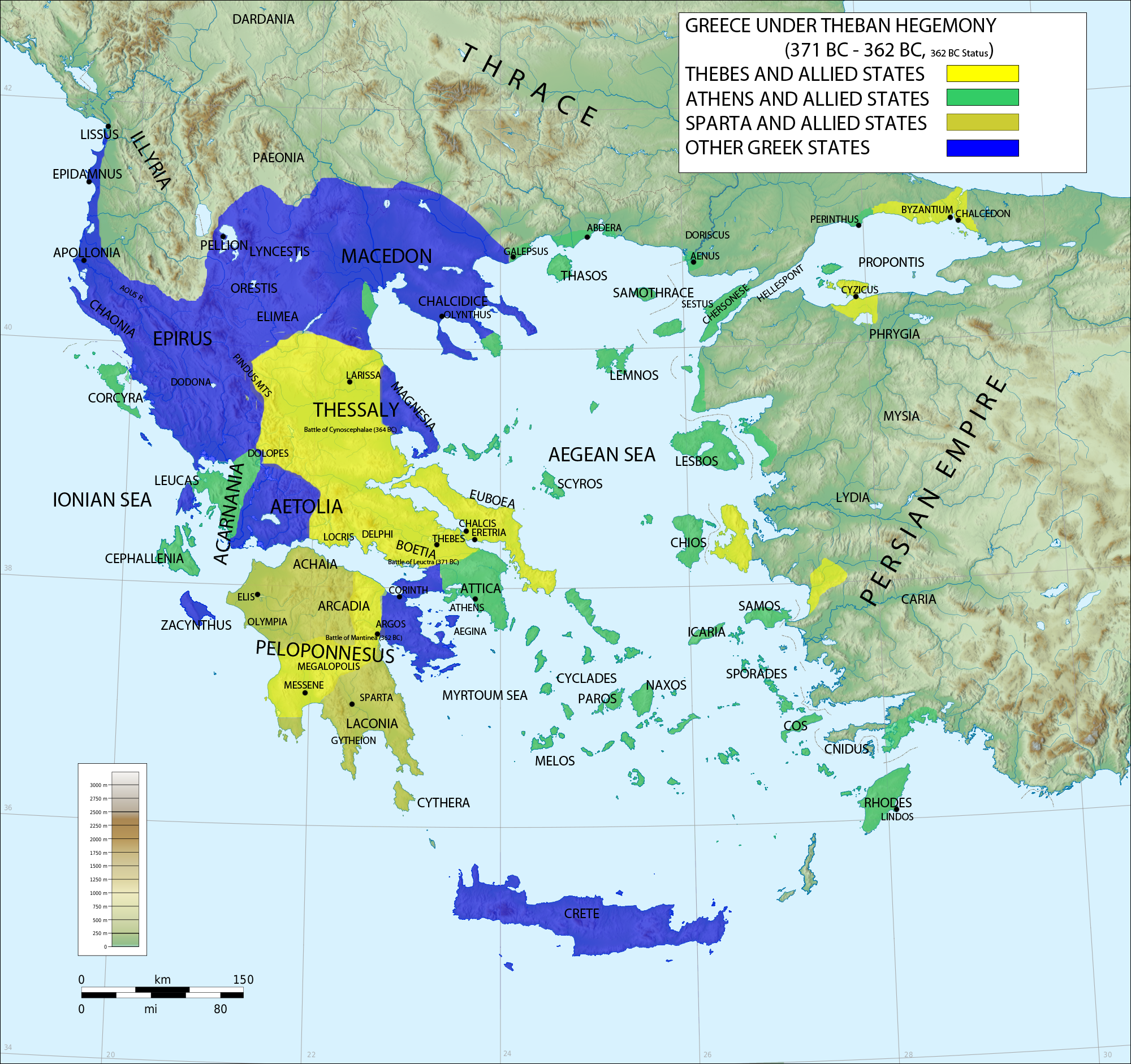
Map of Greece during the height of Theban power in 362 BC, showing Theban, Spartan and Athenian power blocks

Three years later, the Spartan garrison was expelled and a democratic constitution was set up in place of the traditional oligarchy. In the consequent wars with Sparta, the Theban army, trained and led by Epaminondas and Pelopidas, proved itself formidable (see also: Sacred Band of Thebes). Years of desultory fighting, in which Thebes established its control over all Boeotia, culminated in 371 BC in a remarkable victory over the Spartans at Leuctra. The winners were hailed throughout Greece as champions of the oppressed. They carried their arms into Peloponnesus and at the head of a large coalition, permanently crippled the power of Sparta, in part by freeing many helot slaves, the basis of the Spartan economy. Similar expeditions were sent to Thessaly and Macedon to regulate the affairs of those regions.

The predominance of Thebes was short-lived, as the states that it protected refused to subject themselves permanently to its control. Thebes renewed its rivalry with Athens, which had joined with them in 395 BC in fear of Sparta, but since 387 BC had endeavoured to maintain the balance of power against its ally, preventing the formation of a Theban empire. With the death of Epaminondas at the Battle of Mantinea (362 BC), the city sank again to the position of a secondary power.

==== Decline and destruction ====
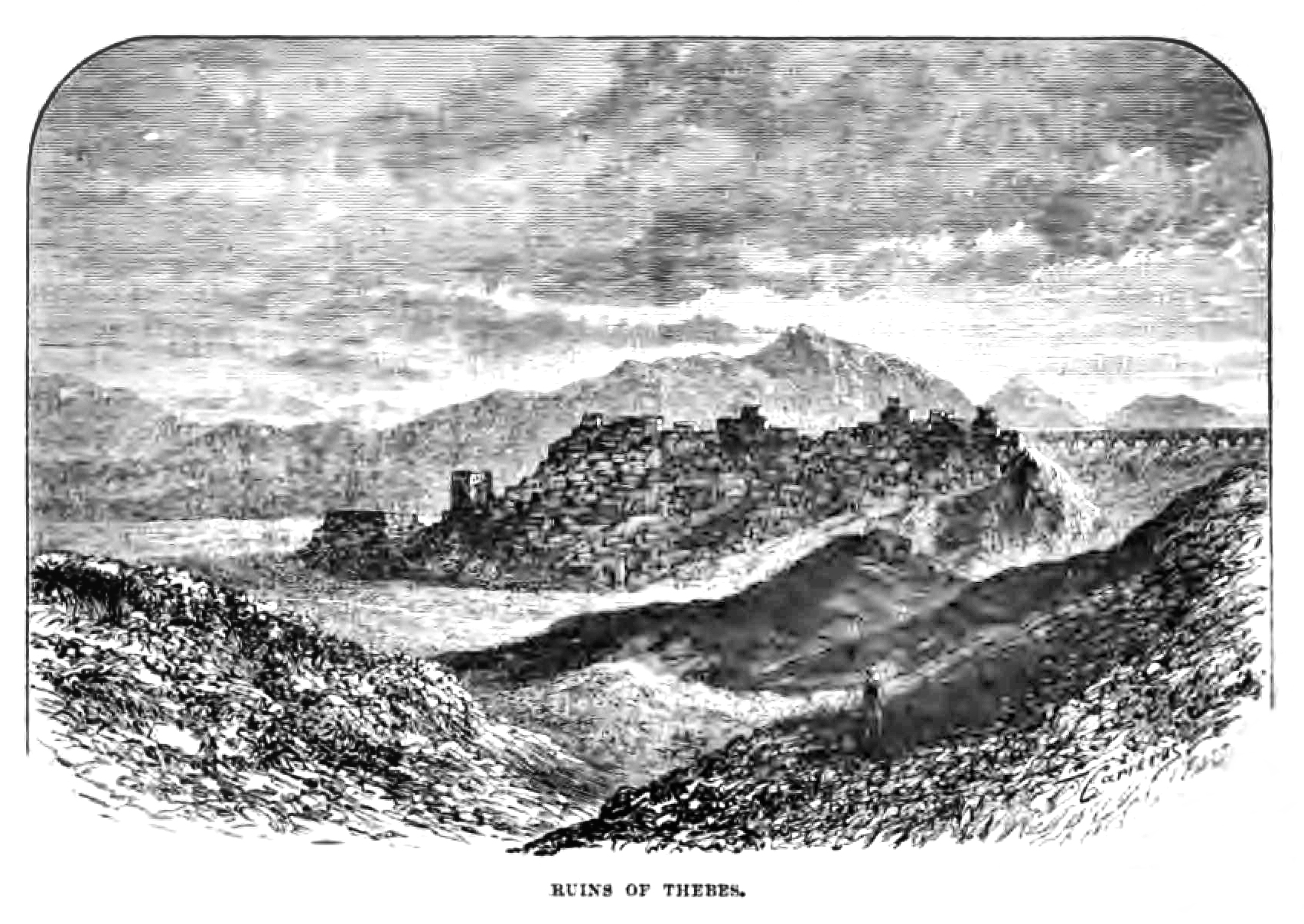
Ruins of Thebes

In the Third Sacred War (356–346 BC) with its neighbor Phocis, Thebes lost its predominance in central Greece. By asking Philip II of Macedon to crush the Phocians, Thebes extended the former's power within dangerous proximity to its frontiers. The revulsion of popular feeling in Thebes was expressed in 338 BC by the orator Demosthenes, who persuaded Thebes to join Athens in a final attempt to bar Philip's advance on Attica. The Theban contingent lost the decisive battle of Chaeronea and along with it every hope of reassuming control over Greece.

Philip was content to deprive Thebes of its dominion over Boeotia; but an unsuccessful revolt in 335 BC against his son Alexander the Great while he was campaigning in the north was punished by Alexander and his Greek allies with the destruction of the city (except, according to tradition, the house of the poet Pindar and the temples), and its territory divided between the other Boeotian cities. Moreover, the Thebans themselves were sold into slavery.

Alexander spared only priests, leaders of the pro-Macedonian party and descendants of Pindar. The end of Thebes cowed Athens into submission. According to Plutarch, a special Athenian embassy, led by Phocion, an opponent of the anti-Macedonian faction, was able to persuade Alexander to give up his demands for the exile of leaders of the anti-Macedonian party, and most particularly Demosthenes and not sell the people into slavery.

==== Hellenistic period ====
Ancient writings tend to treat Alexander's destruction of Thebes as excessive. Plutarch, however, writes that Alexander grieved after his excess, granting them any request of favors, and advising they pay attention to the invasion of Asia, and that if he failed, Thebes might once again become the ruling city-state. Although Thebes had traditionally been antagonistic to whichever state led the Greek world, siding with the Persians when they invaded against the Athenian-Spartan alliance, siding with Sparta when Athens seemed omnipotent, and famously derailing the Spartan invasion of Persia by Agesilaus. Alexander's father Philip had been raised in Thebes, albeit as a hostage, and had learnt much of the art of war from Pelopidas. Philip had honoured this fact, always seeking alliances with the Boeotians, even in the lead-up to Chaeronea. Thebes was also revered as the most ancient of Greek cities, with a history of over 1,000 years. Plutarch relates that, during his later conquests, whenever Alexander came across a former Theban, he would attempt to redress his destruction of Thebes with favours to that individual.

Following Alexander the Great's death in 323 BC, Thebes was re-established in 315 BC by Cassander, one of the diadochi who was ruling in Greece. In restoring Thebes, Cassander sought to rectify the perceived wrongs of Alexander – a gesture of generosity that earned him much goodwill throughout Greece. In addition to currying favor with the Athenians and many of the Peloponnesian states, Cassander's restoration of Thebes provided him with loyal allies in the Theban exiles who returned to resettle the site.

Cassander's plan for rebuilding Thebes called for the various Greek city-states to provide skilled labor and manpower, and ultimately it proved successful. The Athenians, for example, rebuilt much of Thebes's wall. Major contributions were sent from Megalopolis, Messene, and as far away as Sicily and Italy.

Despite the restoration, Thebes never regained its former prominence. The death of Cassander in 297 BC created a power vacuum throughout much of Greece, which contributed, in part, to Thebes's besiegement by Demetrius Poliorcetes in 293 BC, and again after a revolt in 292 BC. This last siege was difficult and Demetrius was wounded, but finally he managed to break down the walls and to take the city once more, treating it mildly despite its fierce resistance. The city recovered its autonomy from Demetrius in 287 BC, and became allied with Lysimachus, the king of Thrace, and the Aetolian League.

=== Roman and Byzantine period ===
After the dissolution of the Boeotian League after the Achaean War of 146 BC, Thebes came under Roman rule. In 27 BC, the city was included in the newly established Province of Achaia. Thebes was assigned to the Eastern Roman Empire after the imperial division of 395. During the early Byzantine period it served as a place of refuge against foreign invaders. In the late 7th century, Justinian II created the Theme of Hellas with Thebes as the capital. The Holy church of Luke the Evangelist was built around the 10th century to commemorate the saint's tomb and relics at the location of his death. During the Byzantine–Bulgarian war of 913–927, Thebes was sacked by Simeon I of Bulgaria.

From the 11th century, Thebes became a centre of the new silk trade, its silk workshops boosted by imports of soaps and dyes from Athens. The growth of this trade in Thebes continued to such an extent that by the middle of the 12th century, the city had become the biggest producer of silks in the entire Byzantine empire, surpassing even the Byzantine capital, Constantinople. The women of Thebes were famed for their skills at weaving. Theban silk was prized above all others during this period, both for its quality and its excellent reputation. This prosperity made it a target for the Normans of Sicily. In 1147, they attacked Boeotia and plundered Thebes. They also captured skilled craftsmen and relocated them to Palermo to develop the Sicilian silk industry. Nonetheless, the city quickly regained its prosperity, attracting Venetian merchants who negotiated advantageous privileges to purchase local silk from the imperial government.

Benjamin of Tudela visited Thebes around 1161 or 1162. At that time, the city served as a regional administrative center, home to a local elite, a major producer of silk textiles, and an important regional market, all of which contributed to urban and demographic growth. Although there is no specific data on Thebes's overall population, estimates suggest it housed between 20,000 and 30,000 inhabitants, typical for a major Byzantine provincial city. Benjamin of Tudela reported that Thebes had a Jewish population of 2,000, the largest Jewish community in any Byzantine city of the 12th century, except for Constantinople.

In 1205, Thebes was conquered by the Latins of the Fourth Crusade.

=== Latin period ===
The Duchy of Athens and the other Greek and Latin states of southern Greece, c. 1210

Thanks to its wealth, the city was selected by the Frankish dynasty de la Roche as its capital, before it was permanently moved to Athens. After 1240, the Saint Omer family controlled the city jointly with the de la Roche dukes. The castle built by Nicholas II of Saint Omer on the Cadmea was one of the most beautiful of Frankish Greece. After its conquest in 1311 the city was used as a capital by the short-lived state of the Catalan Company.

In 1379, the Navarrese Company took the city with the aid of the Latin Archbishop of Thebes, Simon Atumano. (Note: Portions of the historical section were taken from the 1911 Encyclopædia Britannica.)

=== Ottoman period ===
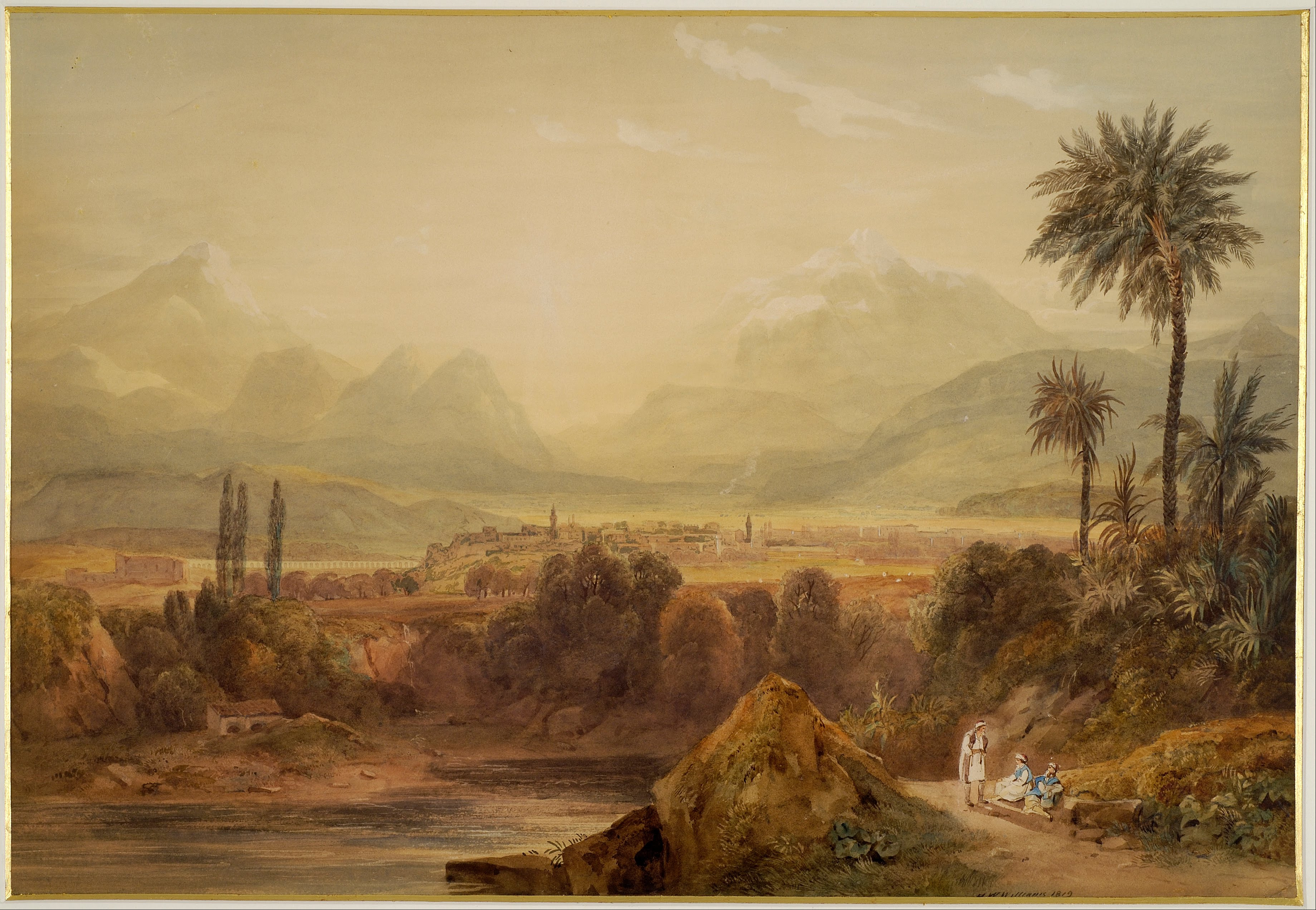
View of Thebes (1819) by Hugh William Williams

Latin hegemony in Thebes lasted to 1458, when the Ottomans captured it. The Ottomans renamed Thebes "İstefe" and managed it until the Greek War of Independence (1821, nominally to 1832) except for a Venetian interlude between 1687 and 1699.

=== Modern city ===
In the modern Greek State, Thebes was the capital of the prefecture of Boeotia until the late 19th century, when Livadeia became the capital.

The city grew rapidly after the 1923 population exchange between Greece and Turkey with the arrival of many Anatolian Greeks from various cities, towns and villages in Ionia. According to the 1928 census, refugees made up almost 35% of Thebes's population, leading to the eventual creation of two refugee neighborhoods.

Today, Thebes is a bustling market town, known for its many products and wares. Until the 1980s, it had a flourishing agrarian production with some industrial complexes. However, during the late 1980s and 1990s the bulk of industry moved further south, closer to Athens. Tourism in the area is based mainly in Thebes and the surrounding villages, where many places of interest related to antiquity exist such as the battlefield where the Battle of Plataea took place. The proximity to other, more famous travel destinations, like Athens and Chalkis, and the undeveloped archaeological sites have kept the tourist numbers low. A notable portion of the inhabitants of Thebes are Arvanites.

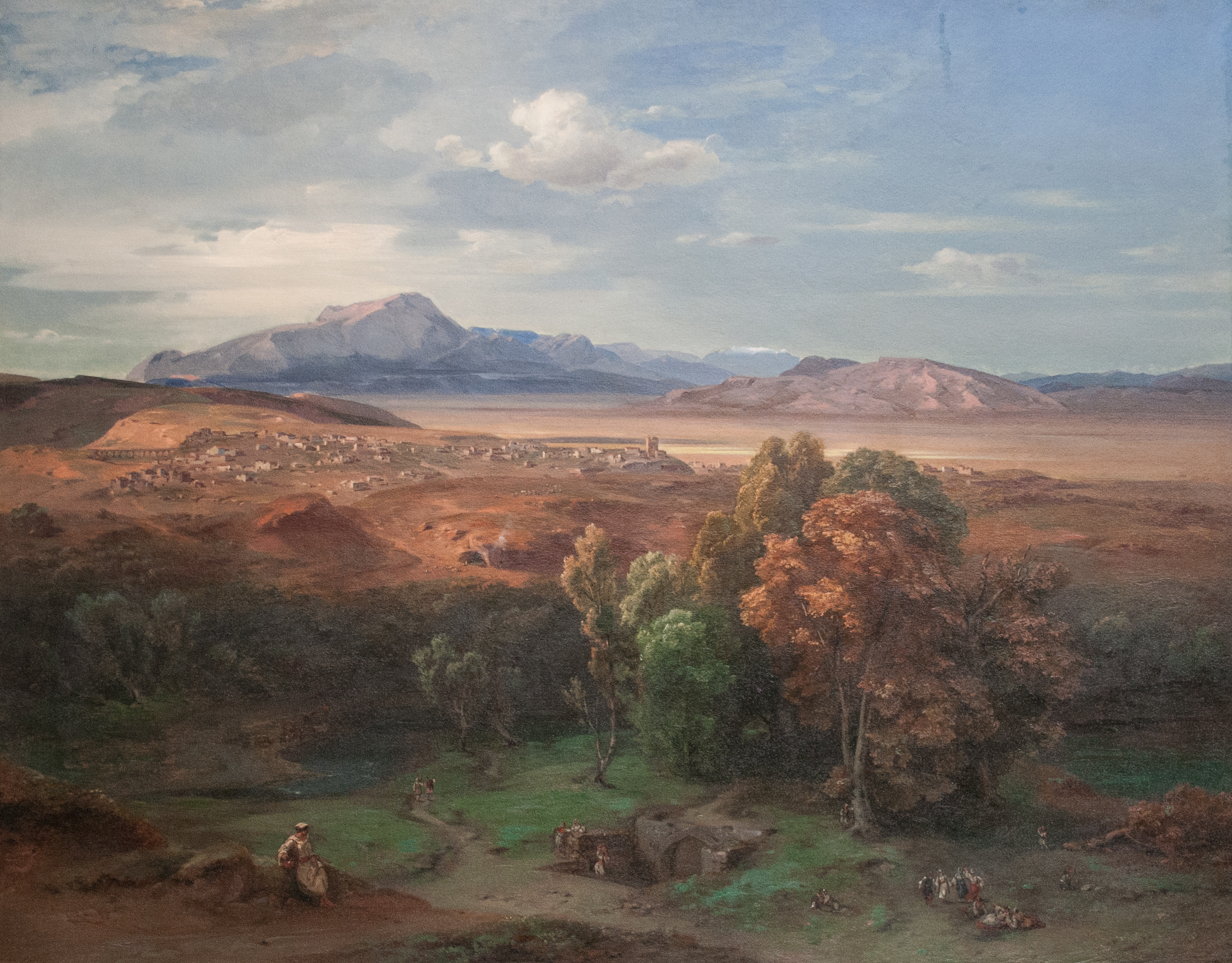
Thebes, 1842 by Carl Rottmann

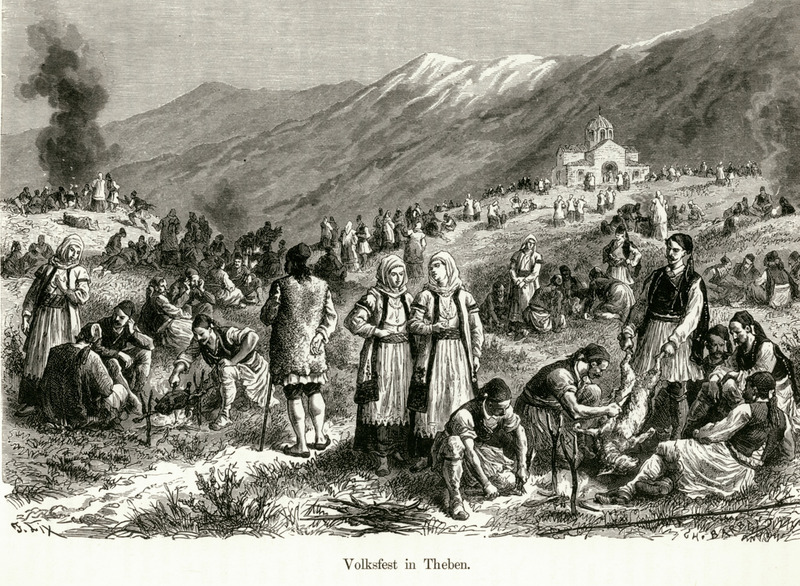
Popular festival at Thebes, 1880s

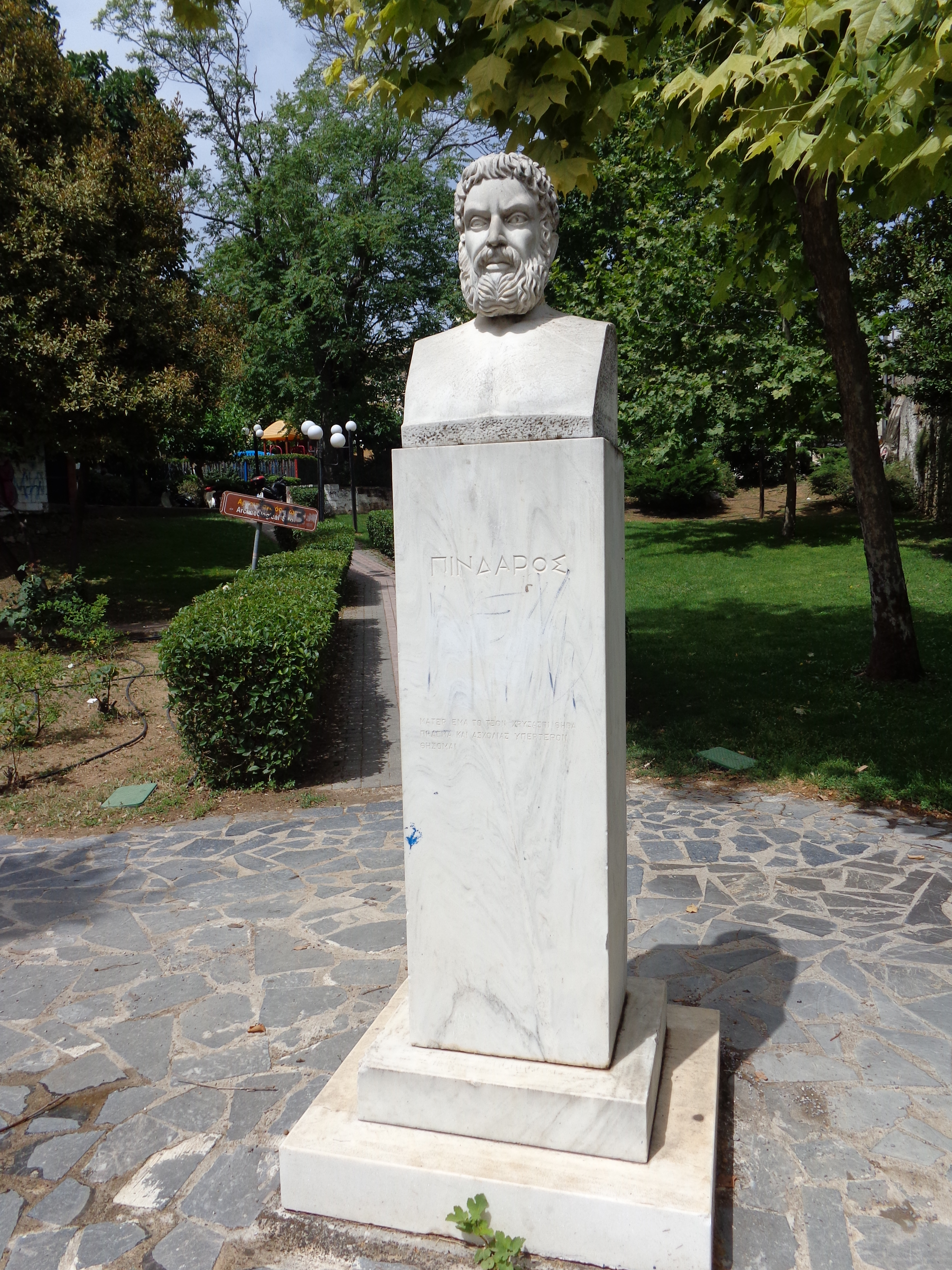
A bust of Pindar

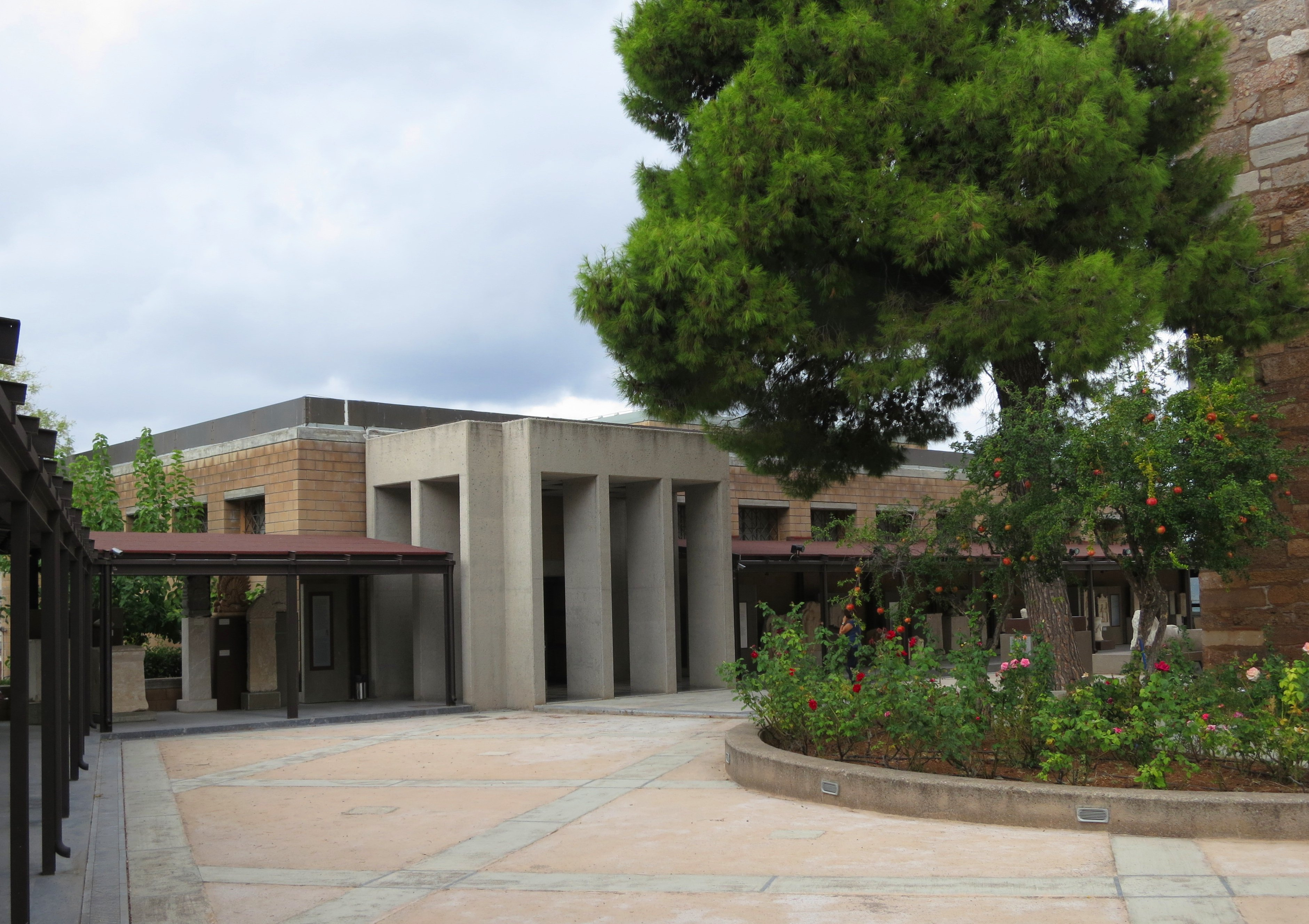
Entrance to the archaeological museum

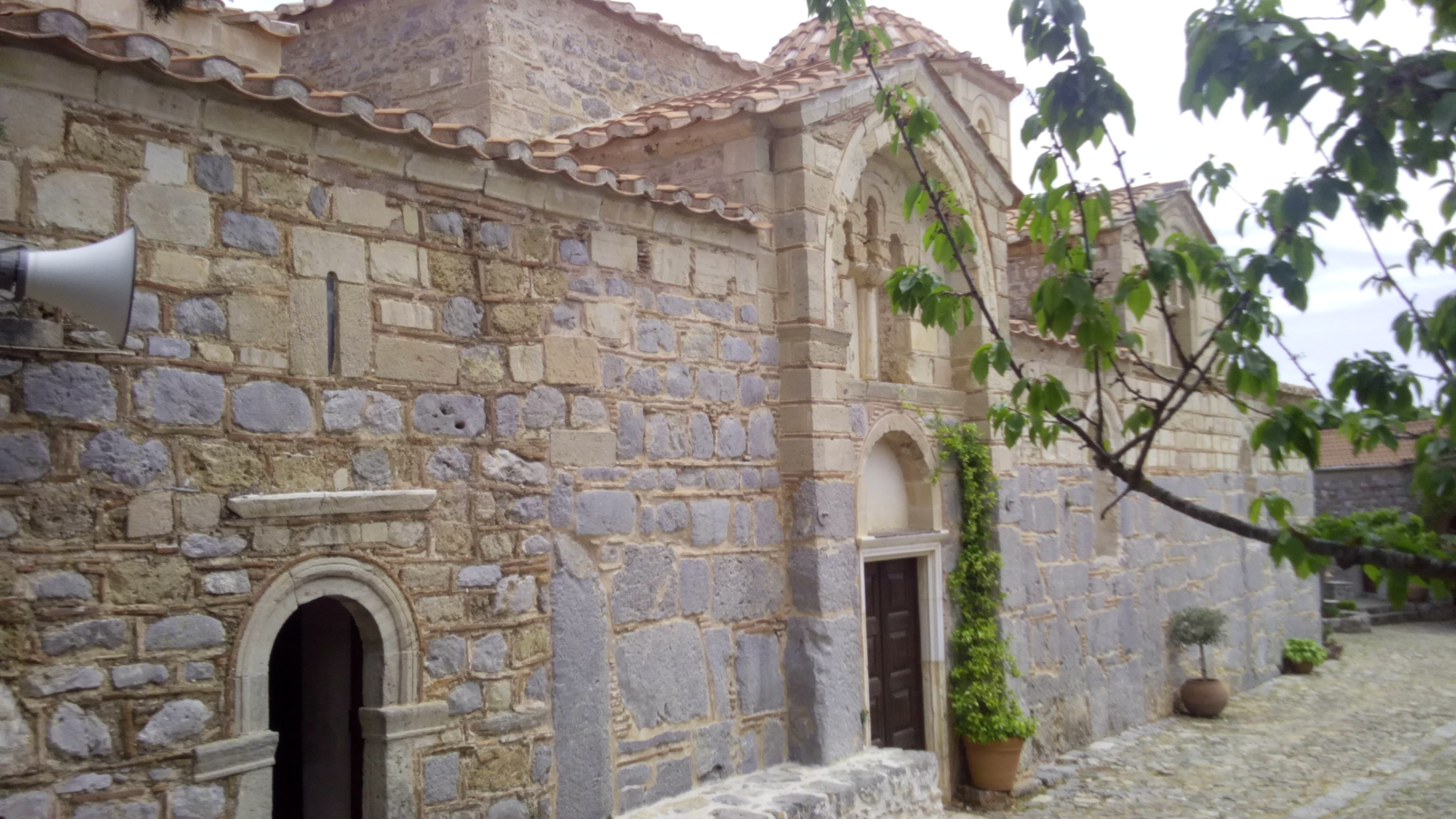
Monastery of the Transfiguration of Christ, Sagmata

== Thebes in Greek mythology ==
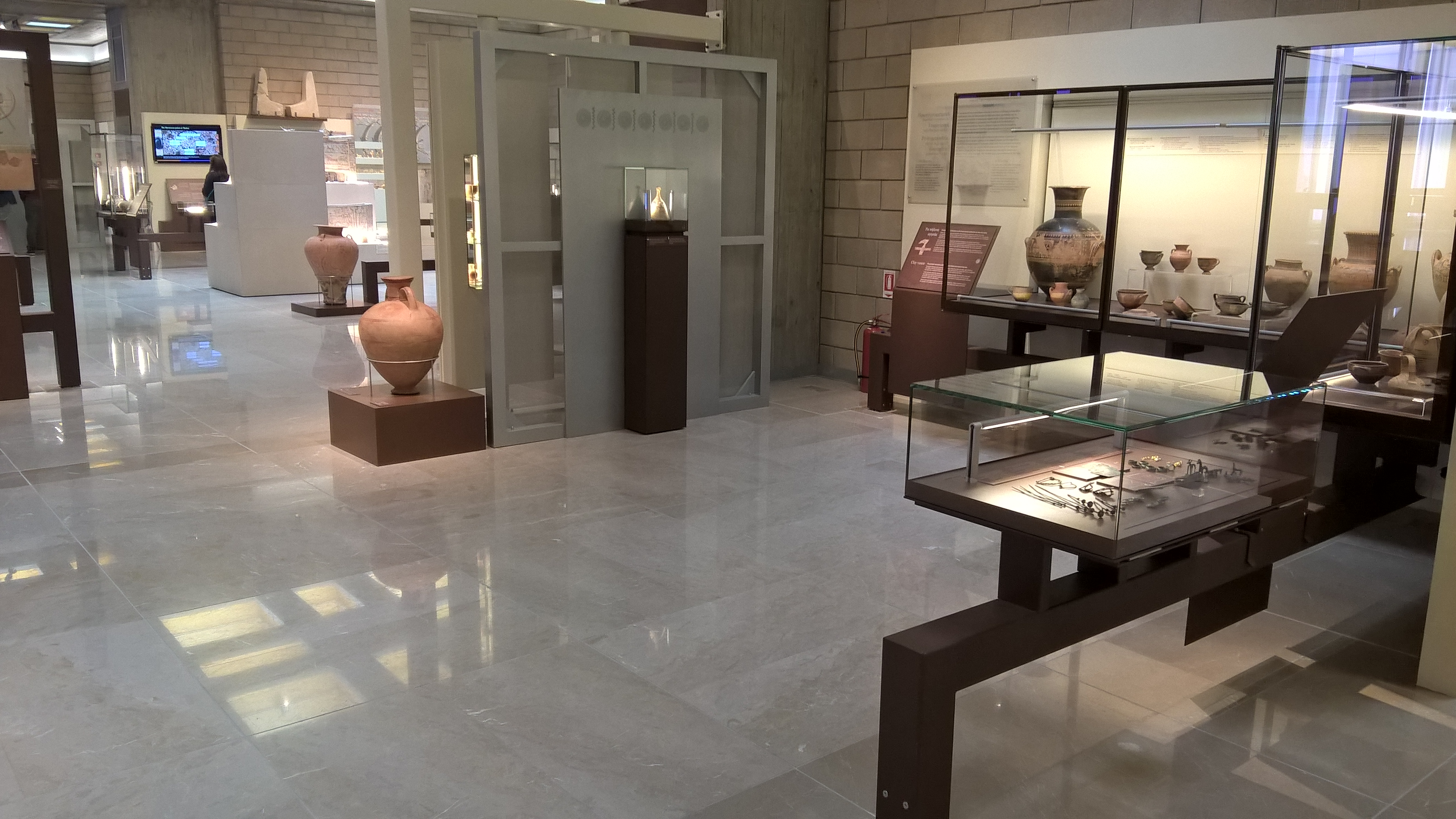
Interior of the Archaeological Museum of Thebes

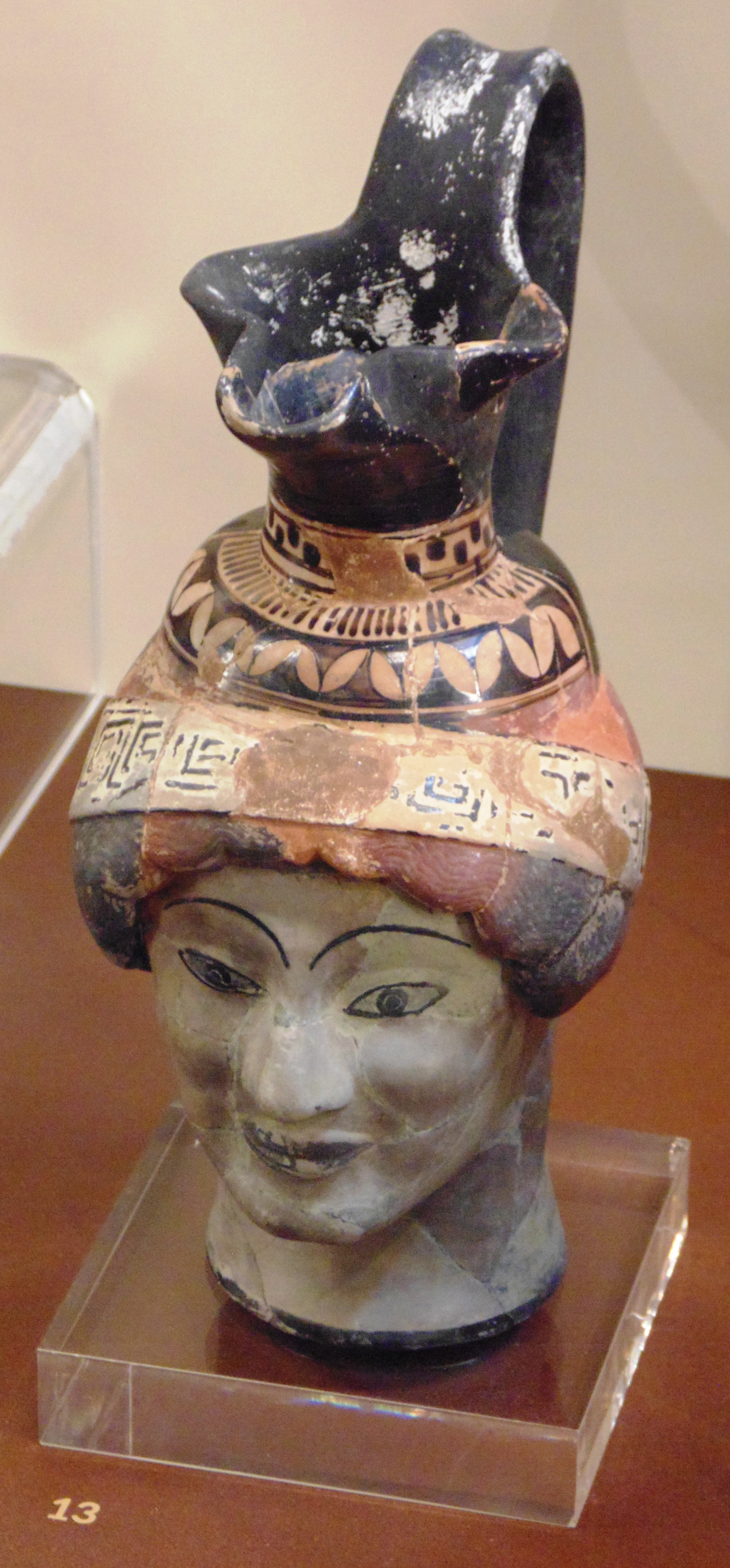
Exhibit at the museum

The record of the earliest days of Thebes was preserved among the Greeks in an abundant mass of legends that rival the myths of Troy in their wide ramification and the influence that they exerted on the literature of the classical age. Five main cycles of story may be distinguished:

1. The foundation of the citadel Cadmea by Cadmus, and the growth of the Spartoi or "Sown Men" (probably an aetiological myth designed to explain the origin of the Theban nobility which bore that name in historical times).
2. The immolation of Semele and the advent of Dionysus.
3. The building of a "seven-gated" wall by Amphion, and the cognate stories of Zethus, Antiope and Dirce.
4. The tale of Laius, whose misdeeds culminated in the tragedy of Oedipus and the wars of the Seven against Thebes and the Epigoni, and the downfall of his house; Laius's pederastic rape of Chrysippus was held by some ancients to have been the first instance of homosexuality among mortals, and may have provided an etiology for the practice of pedagogic pederasty for which Thebes was famous.
5. The exploits of Heracles, who is said to have been born in Thebes.

The Greeks attributed the foundation of Thebes to Cadmus, a Phoenician prince from Tyre (now in Lebanon) and the brother of Princess (later Queen) Europa. Cadmus was famous for teaching the Phoenician alphabet and building the Acropolis, which was named the Cadmeia in his honor and was an intellectual, spiritual, and cultural center.

== Geography ==
Thebes is situated in a plain, between Lake Yliki (ancient Hylica) to the north, and the Cithaeron mountains, which divide Boeotia from Attica, to the south. Its elevation is 215 m (705 ft) above mean sea level. It is about 50 km (31 mi) northwest of Athens, and 100 km (62 mi) southeast of Lamia. The A1 motorway and the Athens–Thessaloniki railway connect Thebes with Athens and northern Greece. The municipality of Thebes covers an area of 830.112 km^{2} (320.508 sq mi), the municipal unit of Thebes 321.015 km^{2} (123.945 sq mi) and the community 143.889 km^{2} (55.556 sq mi).

=== Climate ===
According to the nearby weather station of Aliartos, Thebes has a hot-summer Mediterranean climate (Köppen climate classification: Csa) with hot, dry summers and cool, wet winters. During the winter months, Thebes is sometimes affected by the Aegean sea-effect snow, with snow depths reaching over 50 centimetres (20 in) on several occasions. Due to its inland location, Thebes may also record very low minimums. In recent years, as registered by the meteorological station operated by the National Observatory of Athens within the city limits, the record minimum temperature is −7.9 °C (17.8 °F), recorded on 10 January 2017. In contrast, the city can be very hot in the summer during heat waves, having reached a record high of 44.5 °C (112.1 °F) on 3 August 2021.

Climate data for Aliartos, Thebes (180 m, 1967–2001)
Month	Jan	Feb	Mar	Apr	May	Jun	Jul	Aug	Sep	Oct	Nov	Dec	Year
Mean daily maximum °C (°F)	11.5 (52.7)	12.9 (55.2)	15.6 (60.1)	20.4 (68.7)	25.8 (78.4)	30.9 (87.6)	32.4 (90.3)	31.9 (89.4)	28.6 (83.5)	22.5 (72.5)	17.2 (63.0)	13.1 (55.6)	21.9 (71.4)
Daily mean °C (°F)	7.1 (44.8)	8.3 (46.9)	10.7 (51.3)	15.3 (59.5)	20.7 (69.3)	25.7 (78.3)	27.3 (81.1)	26.4 (79.5)	22.6 (72.7)	17.0 (62.6)	12.2 (54.0)	8.7 (47.7)	16.8 (62.2)
Mean daily minimum °C (°F)	2.9 (37.2)	3.6 (38.5)	5.0 (41.0)	8.1 (46.6)	12.2 (54.0)	16.0 (60.8)	17.9 (64.2)	17.4 (63.3)	14.5 (58.1)	11.0 (51.8)	7.2 (45.0)	4.4 (39.9)	10.0 (50.0)
Average precipitation mm (inches)	77.3 (3.04)	74.1 (2.92)	63.8 (2.51)	40.0 (1.57)	28.8 (1.13)	13.8 (0.54)	6.1 (0.24)	13.8 (0.54)	17.4 (0.69)	69.5 (2.74)	74.1 (2.92)	96.4 (3.80)	575.1 (22.64)
Source: HNMS

== Notable people ==
=== Ancient world ===
- Pindar (c. 518 – 443 BC), poet
- Attaginus, 5th century BC oligarch
- Pelopidas (c. 420 – 365). general and statesman who led a rebellion against Sparta, commanded the Sacred Band of Thebes at Leuctra
- Epaminondas (c. 418 – 362 BC), a general and statesman who commanded the Theban forces at the battles of Leuctra and Mantinea
- Aristides of Thebes, 4th century BC painter
- Nicomachus of Thebes, 4th century BC painter
- Crates of Thebes (c. 365 – c. 285 BC), Cynic philosopher
- Kleitomachos, 3rd century BC athlete
- Luke the Evangelist (died 84 AD), buried here
- Rufus of Thebes, 1st century bishop of Thebes

=== Modern world ===
- Theodoros Vryzakis (c. 1814–1878), painter
- Alexandros Merentitis (1880–1964), military officer
- Panagiotis Bratsiotis (1889–1982), theologian
- Pandelis Pouliopoulos (1900–1943), Greek communist politician
- Ieronymos II of Athens (born 1938), Eastern Orthodox archbishop of Athens and All Greece
- Haris Alexiou (born 1950), singer
- Evangelos Bassiakos (1954–2017), politician

== See also ==
- Graïke
- List of traditional Greek place names
