= Hoplite formation in art =

The hoplites were soldiers from Ancient Greece who were usually free citizens. They had a very uniform and distinct appearance; specifically they were armed with a spear (dory) in their right hand and a heavy round shield in their left.

Hoplite soldiers were organized in battle into the phalanx formation. The goal of this formation was to create uniformity and a powerful military force in order to maximize the effectiveness as the army as a whole, rather than use people as individual fighters. With the hoplite formation everyone was the same in battle. The phalanx formation appeared during the 7th and 8th centuries BC.

The representation of hoplites in art show historians how the Greeks used this formation in battle as well as how the soldiers were dressed and what their armor looked like. The hoplite formation is shown in different styles of pottery such as white ground and black-figure and also on many different types of pottery such an olpe, krater, alabastron, and dinos. Across all depictions, hoplite soldiers wear the same armor and carry the same weapons in the same position. In addition, the aspect of uniformity is emphasized in these representations.

== Representations in art ==
=== Chigi Vase ===
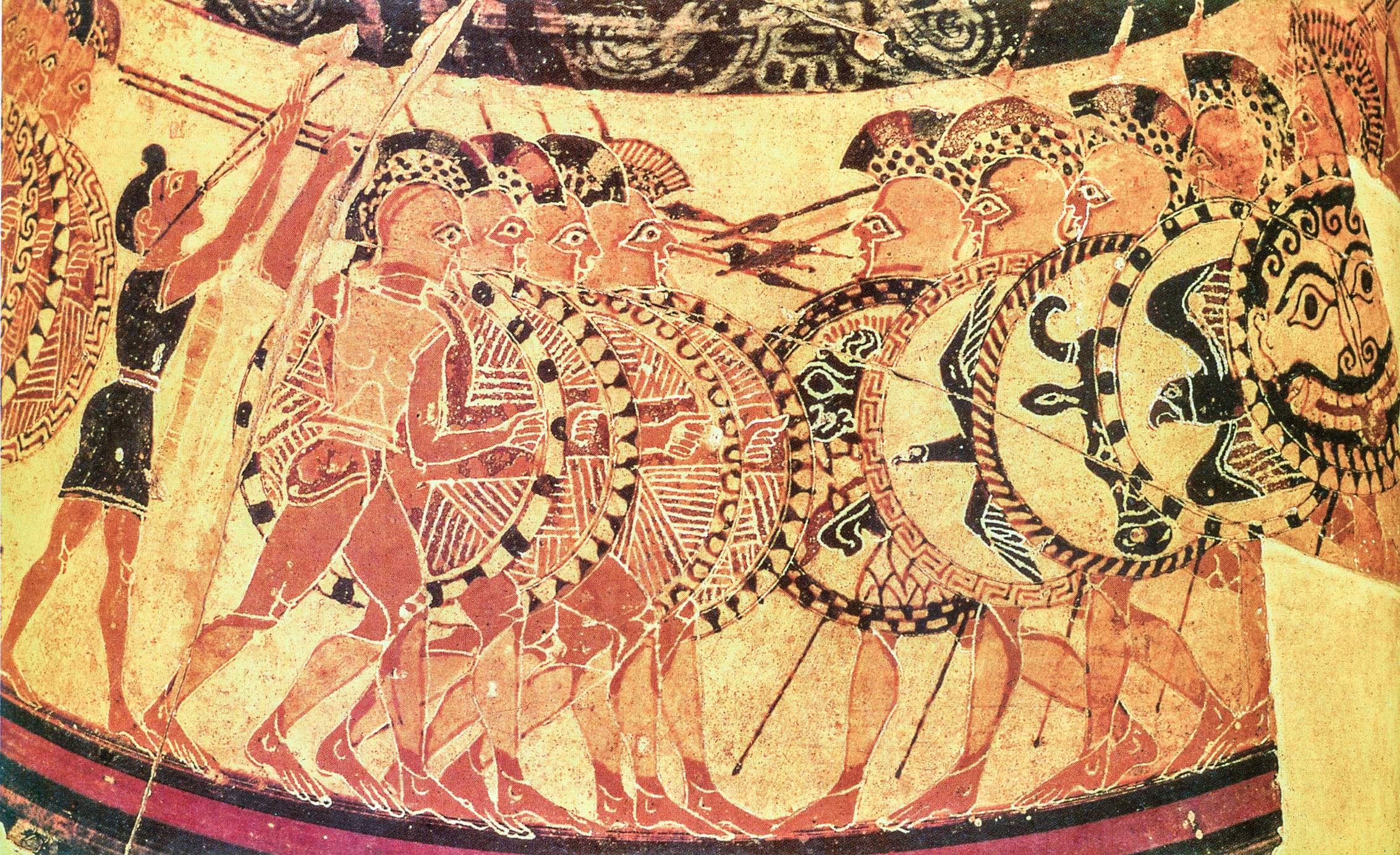
Chigi Vase 650-640 BC

The Chigi Vase is a Protocorinthian olpe and was made by the Chigi Painter from 650-640 BC. The Chigi Vase was discovered in an Etruscan tomb at Monte Aguzzo. It is black-figure style with an unusual use of polychromy. It contains the earliest known representation of the hoplite phalanx formation. The vase shows the moment that the two hoplite formations come in contact in battle. Each soldier is armed with a decorative round shield in their left hand and a long spear in their right as well as a helmet. Behind the soldiers is a flute player that may have been used to keep the hoplites marching correctly. The Chigi vase is arguably one of the most important representations of the Hoplite Soldier in Greek Art. The Chigi Vase gives historians as insight to how the phalanx formation was used in battle.

=== Terracotta alabastron ===
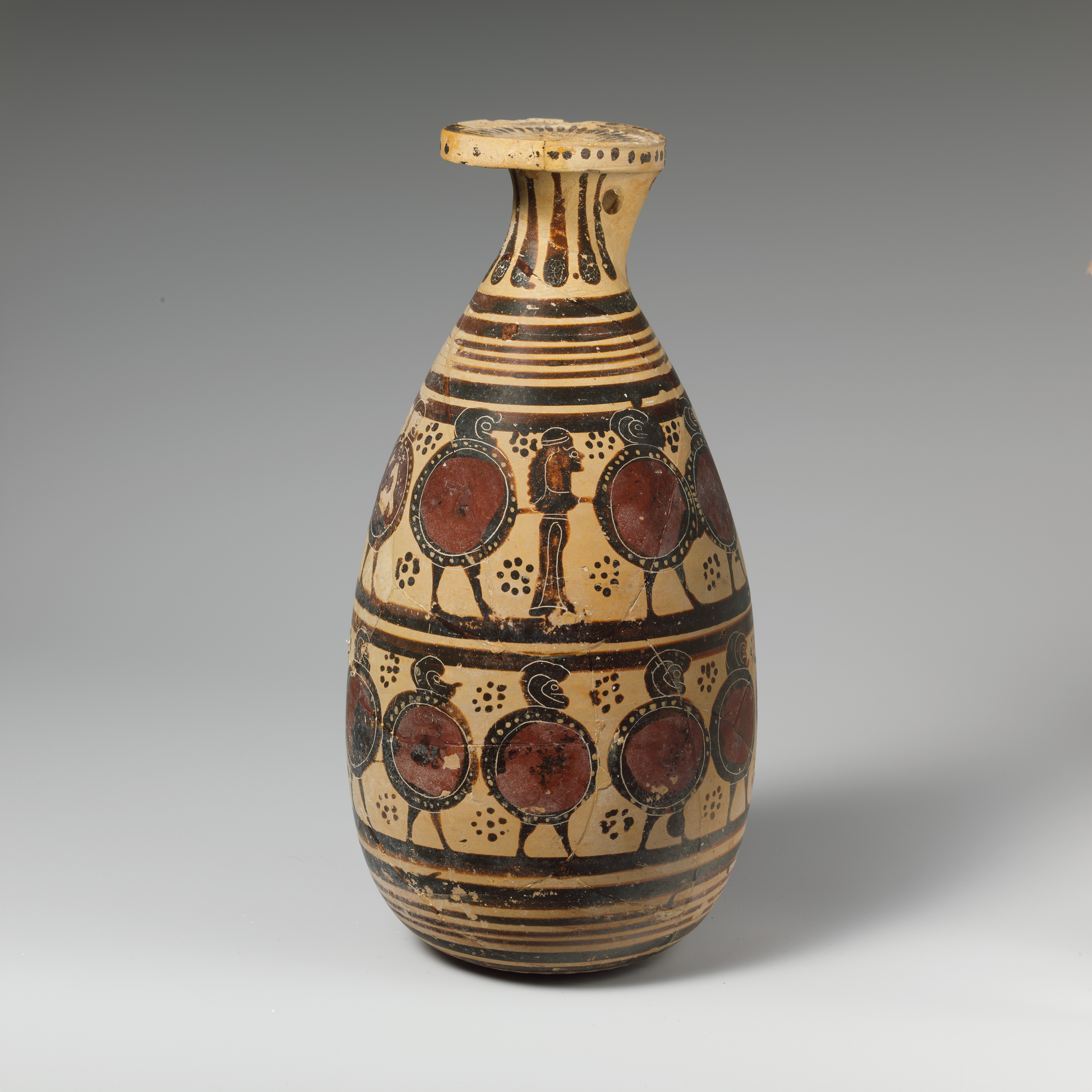
Terracotta alabastron 590–570 BC

This Middle Corinthian perfume vase from 590–570 BC contains two friezes of the hoplite phalanx. The terracotta vase uses a form of black-figure and is only 21.3 cm in height. Both friezes show hoplites with a circular shield in their left hand, spear in their right, as well as a typical hoplite helmet. All of the hoplites are faced in the same way and have about the same distance in between their feet. This could reflect the state of uniformity and the lack of individualism within hoplite warfare. The top frieze is interrupted by another figure who does not resemble a hoplite soldier. The rest of the vase is decorated with lines and dots, creating zones on the vase.

=== Hoplite black-figure dinos ===
This Attic black-figure dinos now located in Musée du Louvre in Paris was made by "The Louvre Painter" in 560 BC. It contains three friezes. The first depicts Troilos and Polyxena at the fountain, a Centauromachy, the return of Hephaistos, and a symposium. The middle frieze shows a hoplite phalanx, and the bottom frieze shows a horse race. The frieze with the hoplites shows two hoplite formations engaging in battle. The hoplite in front of the first phalanx advances to the left over a body. Another hoplite extends his arm as he leans to throw he spear to the warrior in front of him. The warriors on foot all possess typical characteristics of hoplites with their spear and round shield as well as their helmet. In addition the hoplites are close to each other in proximity which is a feature of the phalanx formation.

=== Attic black-figure calyx krater ===
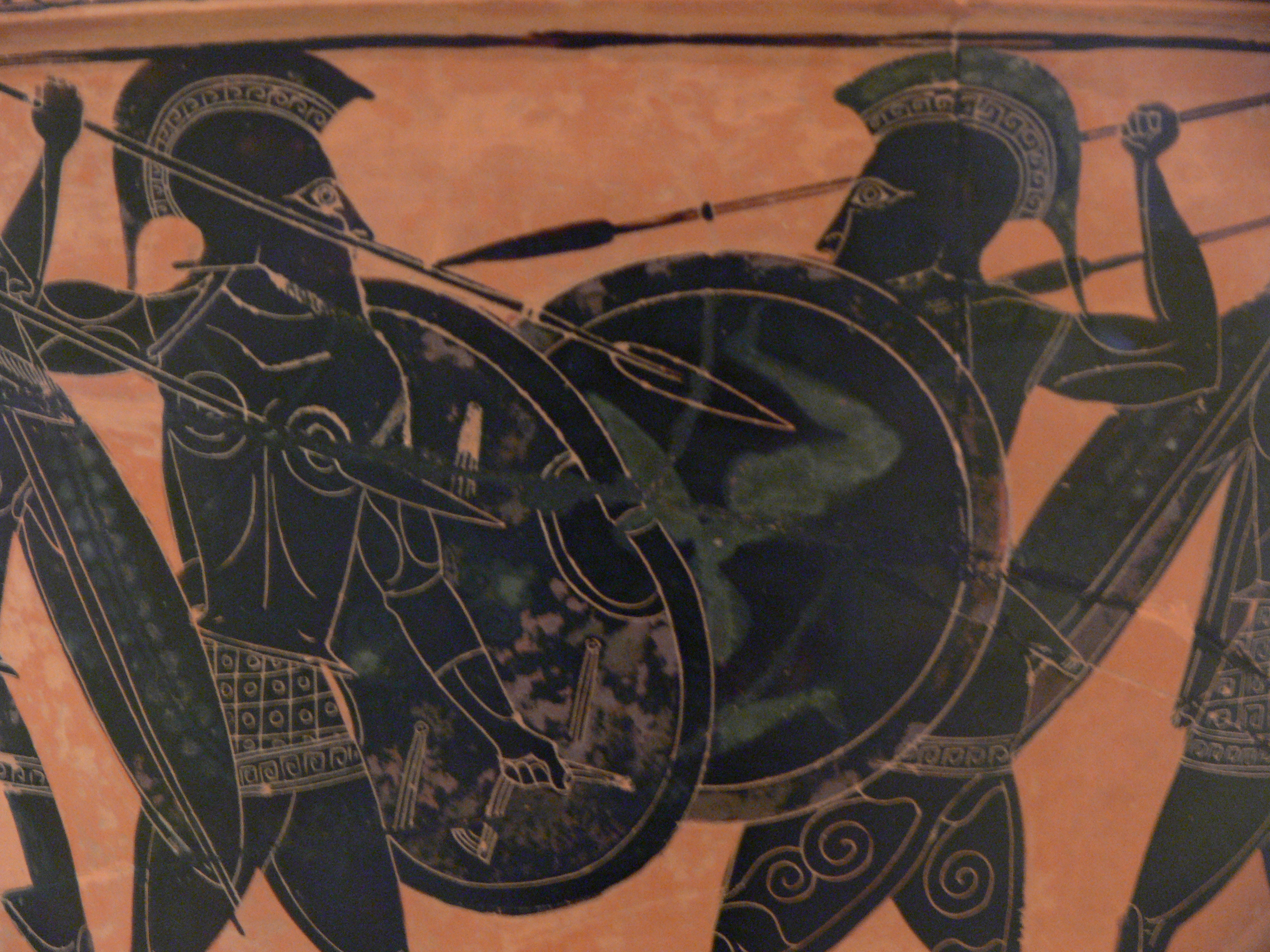
Attic black-figure calyx krater

This calyx krater was made in 530 BCE from Pharsala and uses the black-figure style. It is also painted in the manner of Exekias. The krater depicts the scene a four-horse chariot and a Homeric battle around the body of a dead warrior, that might be Patroclus. The main focus of the scene is on the two hoplites clashing in battle, behind each of them is a hoplite phalanx. This image gives insight into how two hoplite formations engaged in battle. The figures can be identified as hoplites because of their round shield in their left hand as well as their spear in the right hand.

=== Dionysos with Satyr and Maenad alabastron ===
The "Dionysos with Satyr and Maenad ababastron" was made by the Haimon painter in 480 BC and it from the late Archaic period. It is attic black-figure and white ground. The lower frieze represents a Gigantomachy. Herakles and Athena fight five Giants, four of whom are represented as hoplites. The viewer can tell that the Giants are hoplites because of the typical helmets, the round shield held in the left hand, and the spear in the right hand. One of the hoplite Giants is on the ground due to his fight with Athena; the others are attacking Herakles from behind.

This work of art is an interesting take on the typical Gigantomachy. The representation of the hoplite formation in this period hints that the Greeks were still using this formation in warfare. In addition, this alabastron is an example of the combination of a mythological battle (the Gigantomachy) and aspects of real battles (the hoplite formation) that we see in other examples of Greek art, specifically the Temple of Athena Nike on the Akropolis and the Stoa Poikile on the Classical Agora.
