= Warfare in ancient Greek art =

Warfare was a common occurrence in Greece from the Neolithic Period through its conquest by Alexander the Great and until its conquest by the Roman Empire. Because of this, warfare was a typical theme in many pieces of ancient Greek art. Many works of art, like the Doryphoros or the chryselephantine statue of Athena Parthenos, used military objects in their composition, and many others, like the Chigi vase, had warfare as their main subject. Ancient Greek art is an important aspect of not just the history of art, but the history of warfare as well, due to its frequent spot on many works of ancient Greek art. As each different period in Greek history occurred, more and more types of art formed, as well as differing depictions of warfare.

== Bronze Age ==
In Minoan art, warfare is not explicitly shown, but rather different interpretations were made that could tie into warfare. For example, bull-leaping was an activity Minoan men did and the struggle between man and bull could be a depiction of warfare.

== Archaic period ==
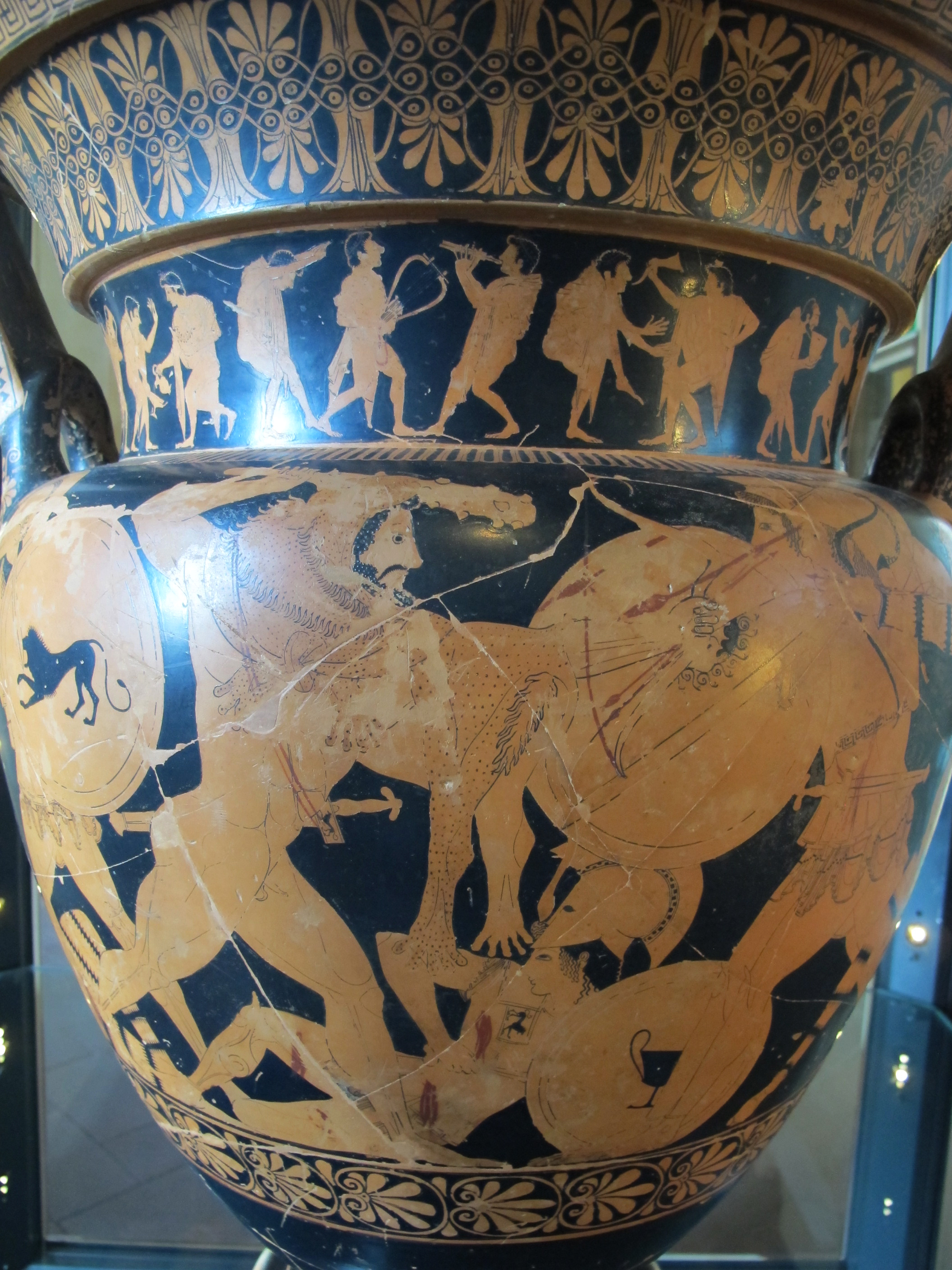
The Arezzo 1465 Vase

During the Archaic Period, depictions of warfare in Greek art held importance in status markings, and also provide insight as to the trading markets during this era. For example, the Arezzo 1465 vase, an Attic volute krater attributed to Euphronios in the Late Archaic Era, depicts an amazonomachy, and was found in the Etruria region, indicating the expanse of the trade networks. Warfare as a status symbol further solidifies a reasoning behind this trade, since any art with warfare depictions on it thereby becomes a sort of luxury item sought after by those wishing to elevate their own status because aspects and physical areas of Greek society tended to extol military prestige and virtue. Proving oneself in battle distinguished one from the others and brought glory (klèos) to their families; consequently owning any art depicting warfare displayed one's wealth and elite status.

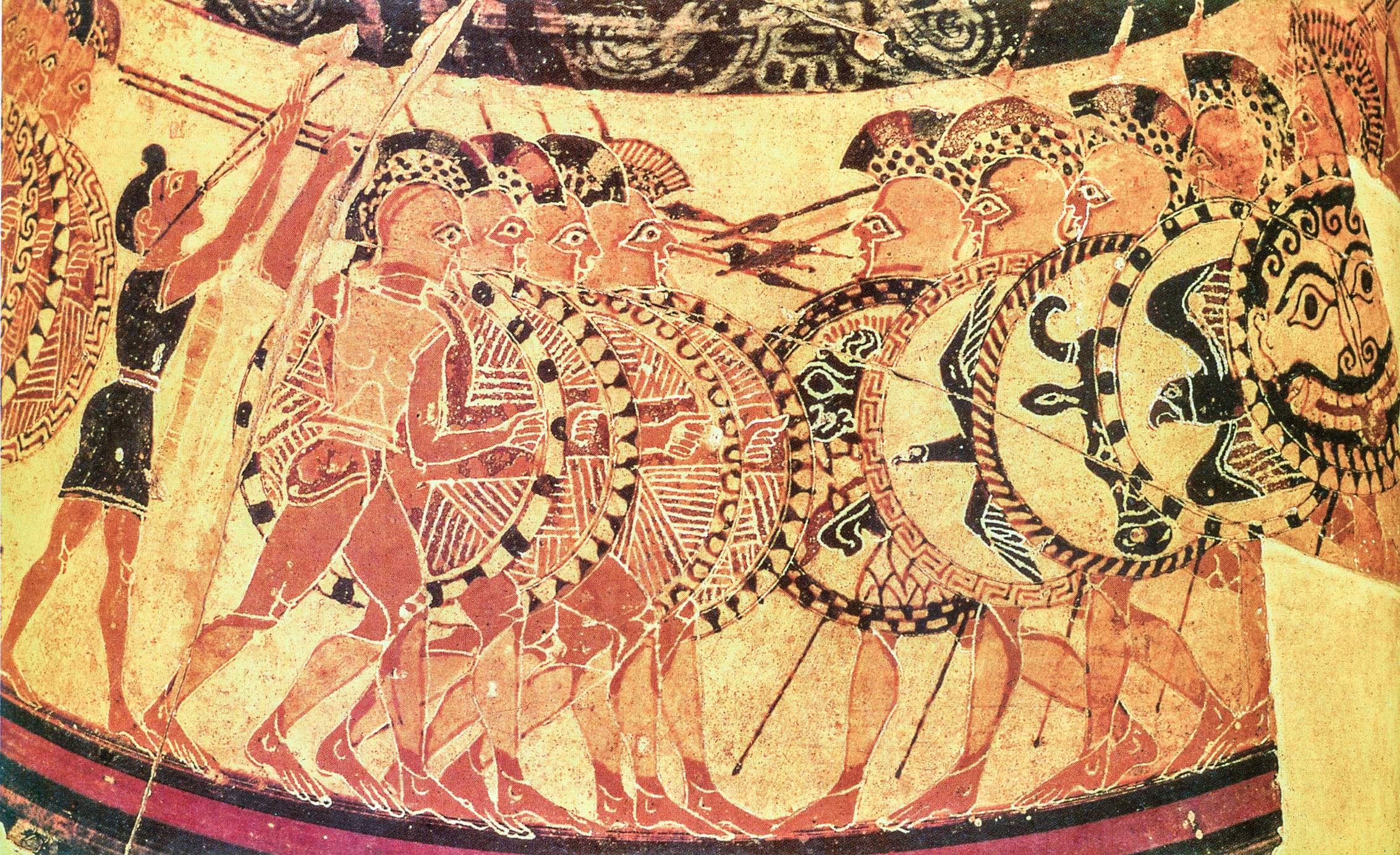
Hoplite warfare on the Chigi vase

During the Archaic period many artists began to depict the hoplite formation in art. Representations of the hoplite phalanx give historians a look into how the Greeks used this style of warfare in battle. Hoplites can be identified by their spear and their shield as well as their position next to other soldiers. One of the most popular representations of the hoplite phalanx is in the Chigi vase. The hoplite formation is portrayed on many different types of pottery such as the Dinos, the Krater, and the Alabastron; and it many different styles such as black figure and white ground.

During the Archaic period there are pieces of artwork that depict the aulos player. One of the most prominent pieces show how the aulos player helped keep the hoplite soldiers in step by playing them into battle. With the help of the aulete, they were able to keep their shields close together to prevent the opposing phalanx from penetrating their ranks.

According to Richard Neer, at the temple of Hera "the Archaic votives are masculine and martial: helmets and 'smiting figurines'".

== Classical period ==
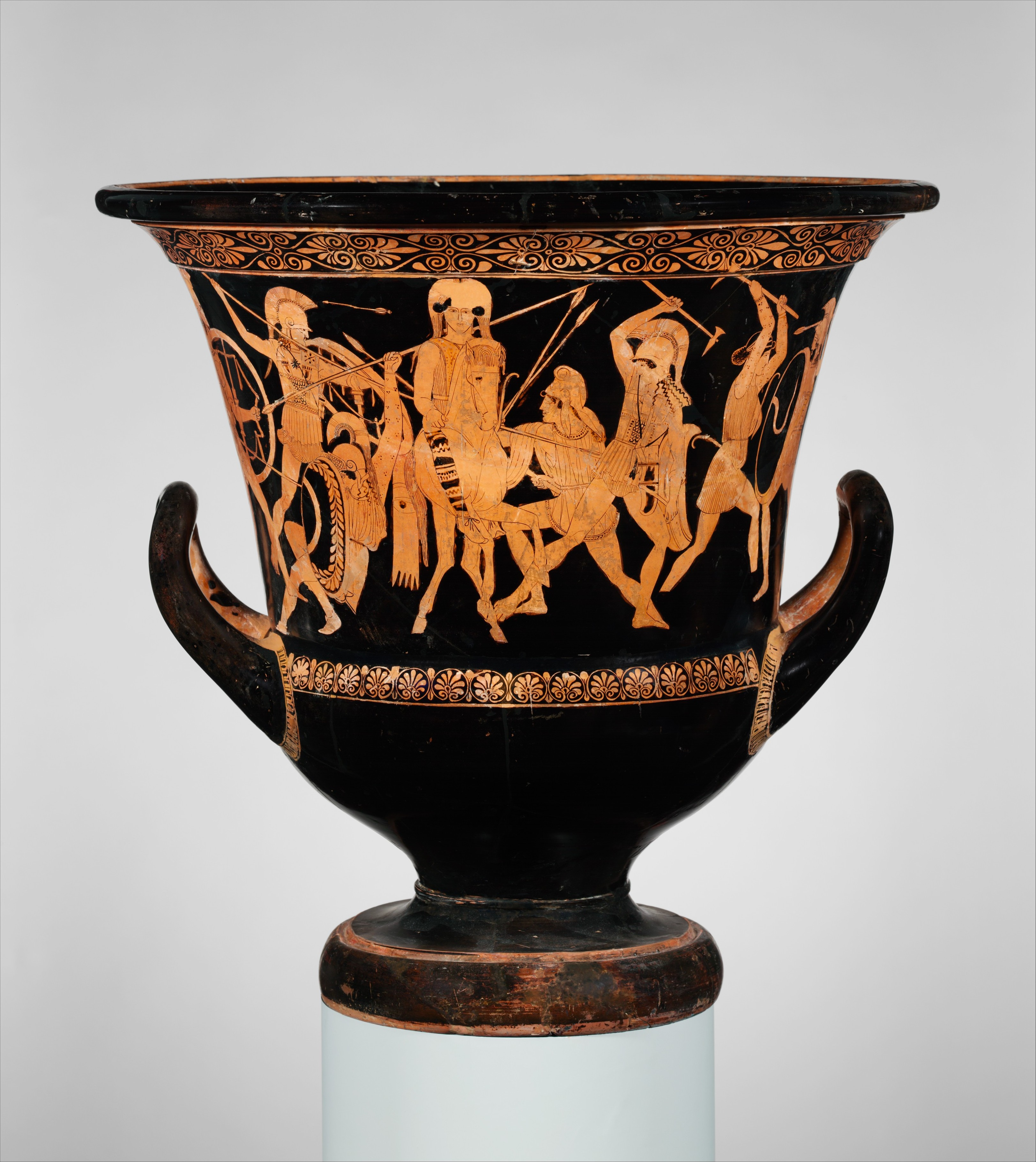
Calyx-Krater by the Painter of the Berlin Hydra

The Classical Period involved many scenes relating and alluding to the Persian wars. This allusion can include some of the numerous depictions of mythical battle scenes such as amazonomachies, gigantomachies, and centauromachies during the period. Such themes and mythological scenes can be seen in depictions like the one on the Calyx-Krater by the painter of the Berlin Hydria depicting an Amazonomachy, or the Gigantomachy by the Suessula Painter.

The first quarter of the Classical Period involved a lot of warfare, including the Persian Wars. Many Greek cities were sacked by the Persians during the second Persian War, taking a toll on several city-states. Themistoclean Walls were built quickly following the Greek victory of the Second Persian Wars, using destroyed sculptures and buildings to construct them. These re-purposed stones used in the building of Themistoclean walls is known as spolia. The Classical Period was also a time of Athenian control over Greece, powerwise, but also military wise and Athenian pottery was the most popular and well-spread over Greece.

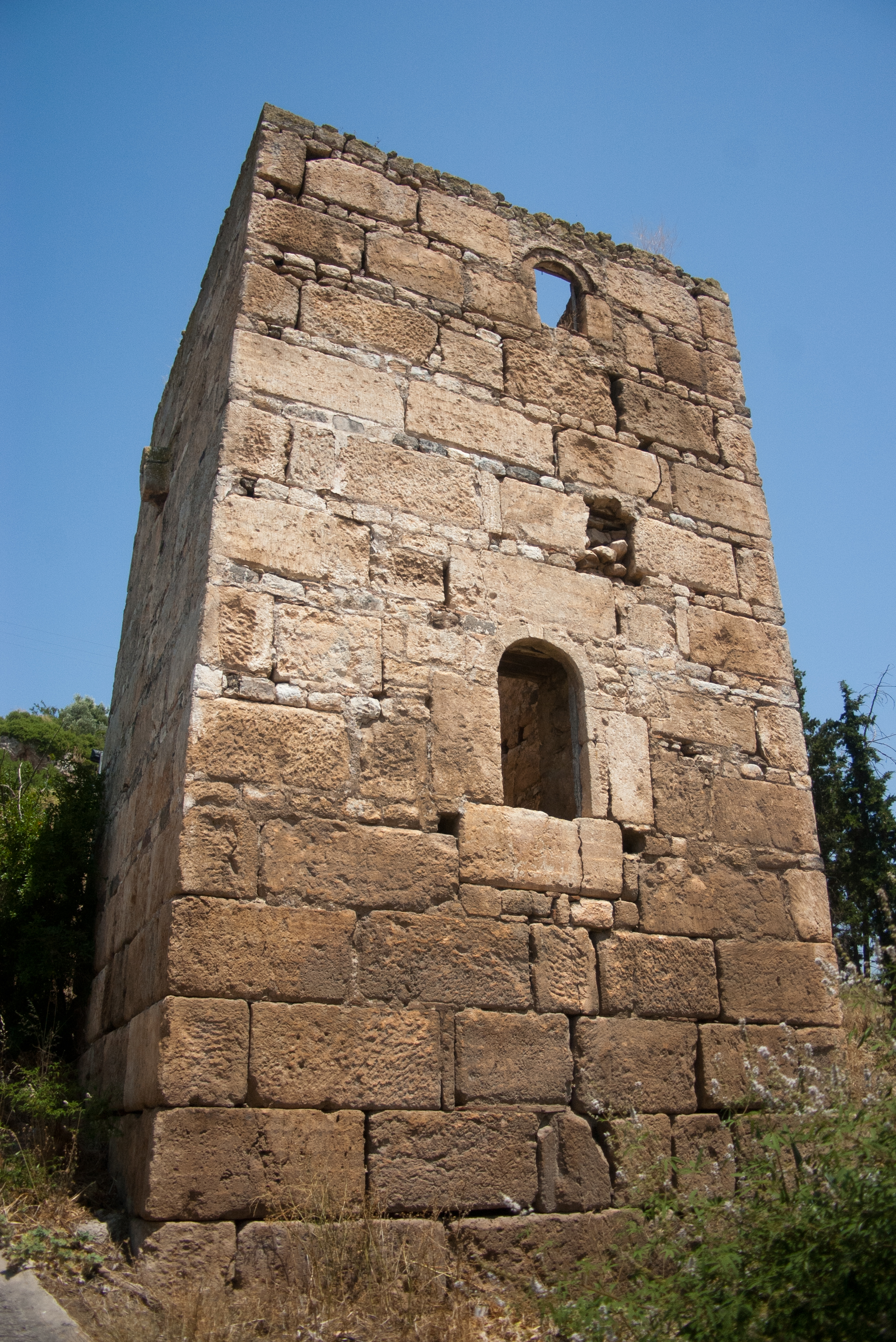
Hellenistic tower from Achinos, Phthiotis

== Hellenistic Period ==
Aside from a build up of architecture, other aspects of Greek culture, such as grave markers, were also becoming monumental. A majority of sculpture during this period was more grand and celebrated triumph and the power of the Greeks as a whole community or civilization.

Additionally, military monuments dedicated to the gods continued to remain prominent in Hellenistic culture. One such monument is the Neorion at Samothrace, a monumentalized ship dedication within the Sanctuary of the Great Gods at the Greek island of Samothrace. Such architectural monuments demonstrate the continued importance of religiosity in art regarding warfare, even in a sanctuary concerned with larger mystery cults unrelated to war. This is a continued theme reflected in threads from the depiction of myth in the Archaic and Classical Periods, to the bull-leaping of the Minoans in the Bronze Age, which is considered potentially both religious and militaristic in nature.

Alexander the Great rose to prominence by winning the war which saw the end of the Persian Empire. Paintings and sculptures depicting battles and participants in the war were common in this period.
