= Calyx krater with Amazonomachy by the Painter of the Berlin Hydria =

Ancient Greek painted vase

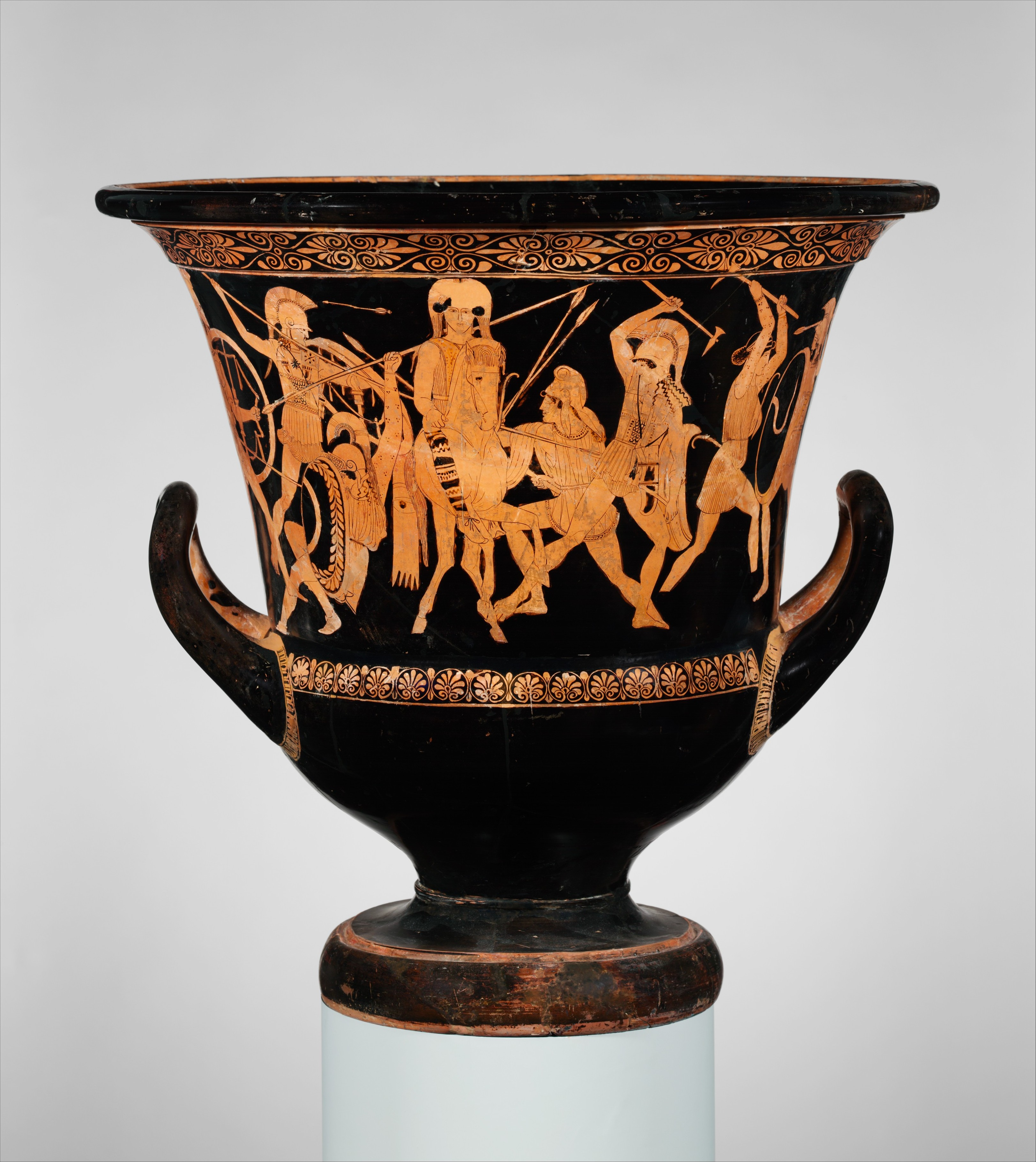
Calyx krater by the Painter of the Berlin Hydria

The Calyx krater with Amazonomachy by the Painter of the Berlin Hydria is an ancient Greek painted vase in the red figure style, now in the Metropolitan Museum of Art, New York. It is a krater, a bowl made for mixing wine and water, and specifically a calyx krater, where the bowl resembles the calyx of a flower. Vessels such as these were often used at a symposion, which was an elite party for drinking.

The Amazonomachy or "battle of the Amazons" is a subject often shown on Greek vases.

The krater was found in 1901 or 1902 in the necropolis of Numana.

== Description ==
Warfare depicted in Greek art was often not representative of actual ancient warfare, but rather depictions of epic and mythological scenes. This depiction style became common in the 6th century, possibly reflecting the political and social turmoil Greece was beginning to experience, and the desire to triumph over barbarians. In the 5th century, with the adoption of the novel red-figure vase painting technique, amazonomachies changed slightly, beginning to shift from depicting just the defeated to illustrating a real threat.

This calyx krater was made in the Classical Period of ancient Greece, c. 460–450 BCE. It is a red-figure vase made of terracotta and attributed to the painter of the Berlin Hydria. The vase is from the region of Attika and is 21.9375 in (55.8) cm high and 22.9375 in (58.3) cm in diameter. The figures and poses seen are representative of the time in which it was made, evoking a sense of pathos and showing motion. The complexity and overlapping of items and figures evoke a dramatic representation of the battle.

From left to right there is a Greek soldier holding a raised spear and poised to strike. The next figure is a falling Amazon who is half hidden behind her shield. In the center there is a mounted Amazon sitting calmly on her horse. Beside her is a crouched Amazon who appears to be striking something behind the horse. To the right of that Amazon is another Greek soldier leaning away with an ax raised above his head. On the far right is an Amazon with an ax raised above her head apparently preparing to strike a Greek soldier around the side of the vase.
