= Gigantomachy by the Suessula Painter =

Ancient Greek work of art

Red-figure Amphora
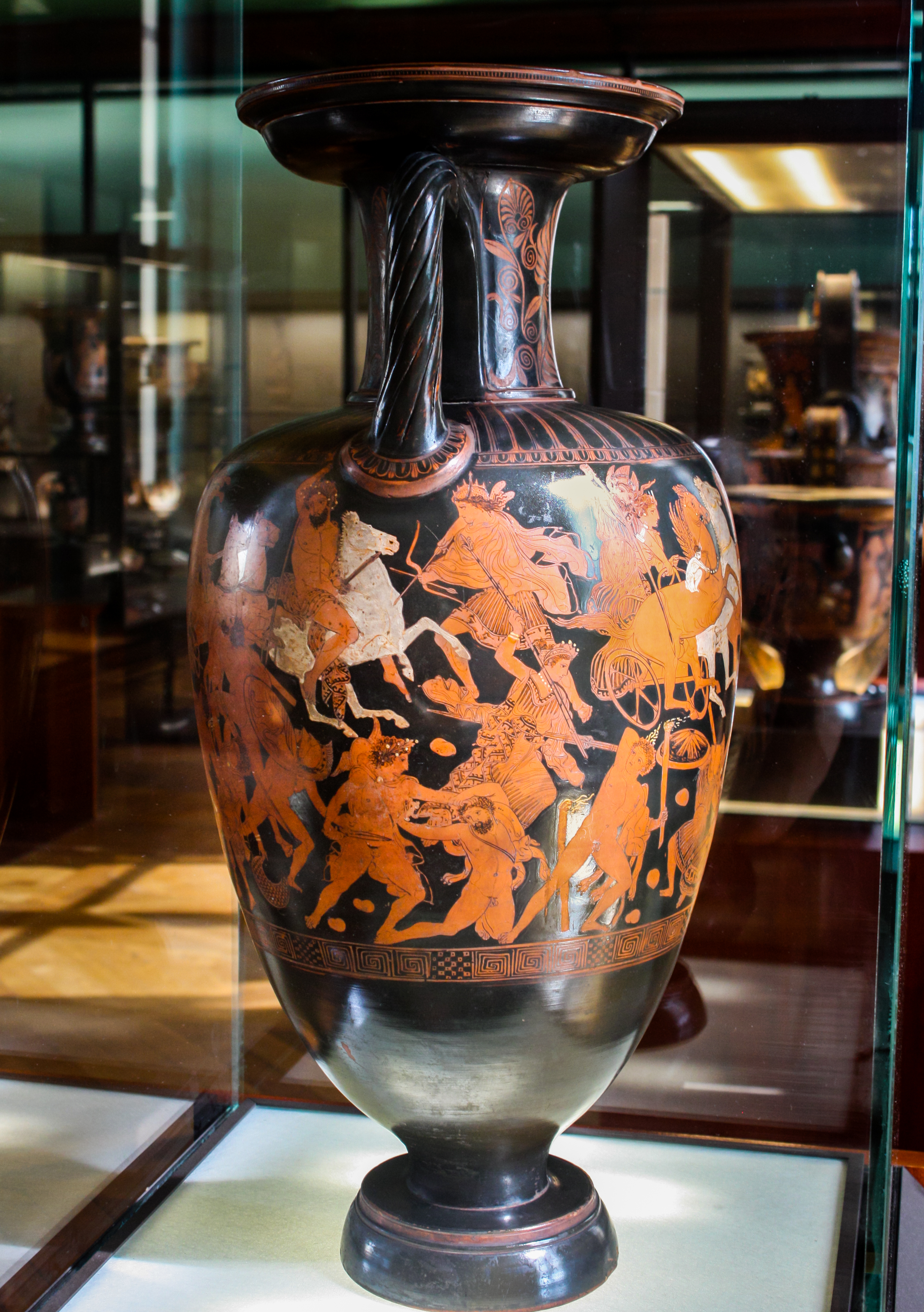
- The vase on display among other Greek antiquities in the Louvre
- Material: Ceramic
- Created: between 410 and 400 BCE
- Present location: Louvre Museum

The gigantomachy by the Suessula Painter is a painting on a red-figure amphora from the Classical period of Greece. It is the work of the Suessula Painter, an Athenian vase-painter whose name is unknown. He worked in both Corinth and Athens and is recognizable by his style, with great freedom of posture and a unique shading of figures. Created around 410–400 BCE, this notable example of red-figure pottery stands 69.5 cm tall, 32 cm wide.

== Artwork ==
This vase is separated in registers, with the largest register encircling the belly of the amphora being the only one decorated with mythological scenes; the one below is empty and the one above is simply covered in floral motifs. The vase differs in its two sides; both represent the Gigantomachy, the fight between the Giants, Gaïa's sons and the Olympian gods, accompanied by Herakles. The first side is much more elaborated than the second one, leading specialists to believe it might be a reproduction of the Gigantomachy of Phidias depicted inside the shield of the Parthenon Athena.

On the A side, one can see Zeus ready to hit a Giant identified as Porphyrion with his lightning bolt, next to Nike on a chariot run by horses, while Dionysus' chariot one is run by panthers. Poseidon is on the same side, on the back of a horse. Athena and Herakles – with his leonte, the skin of Nemean lion, killed for his first labor – are fighting side by side, under Nike's carriage. Around them, and recognizable by their varying attributes are Apollo, Artemis, and Hermes. They all are fighting giants, recognizable by the fact that they are not wearing any kind of clothes.

On the less intricate B side, a reproduction of the shield, is the rest of that Gigantomachy scene, with Ares and Aphrodite on a chair in the middle. Demeter, Persephone, Hekate, and the Dioskouroi are also present and fighting the Giants.

== Context ==
The painting was made by an Athenian artist at the peak of Athenian imperialism over the Greek world after winning the Greco-Persian wars and taking control of the treasury of the Delian League. Representations of Gigantomachy, Centauromachy, or Amazonomachy were quite common during the High Classical Period: depictions of the Olympian gods triumphing over outsider societies were a metaphor of the Athenian victory over the Persians, and their subsequent supremacy over Greece.

== See also ==
- Warfare in ancient Greek art
- Suessula

== Bibliography ==
- Martine Denoyelle, Chefs d'oeuvre de la céramique grecque dans les collections du Louvre, 1994, Éditions de la Réunion des musées nationaux, p. 154, n 72
- Devambez, "L'Amazone de l'amphore de la Gigantomachie au Louvre et le bouclier de la Parthénos", Mélanges Orlandos, 1964, pp. 102-9, pl. 28, 29
