= Haimon Painter =

Ancient Greek vase painter

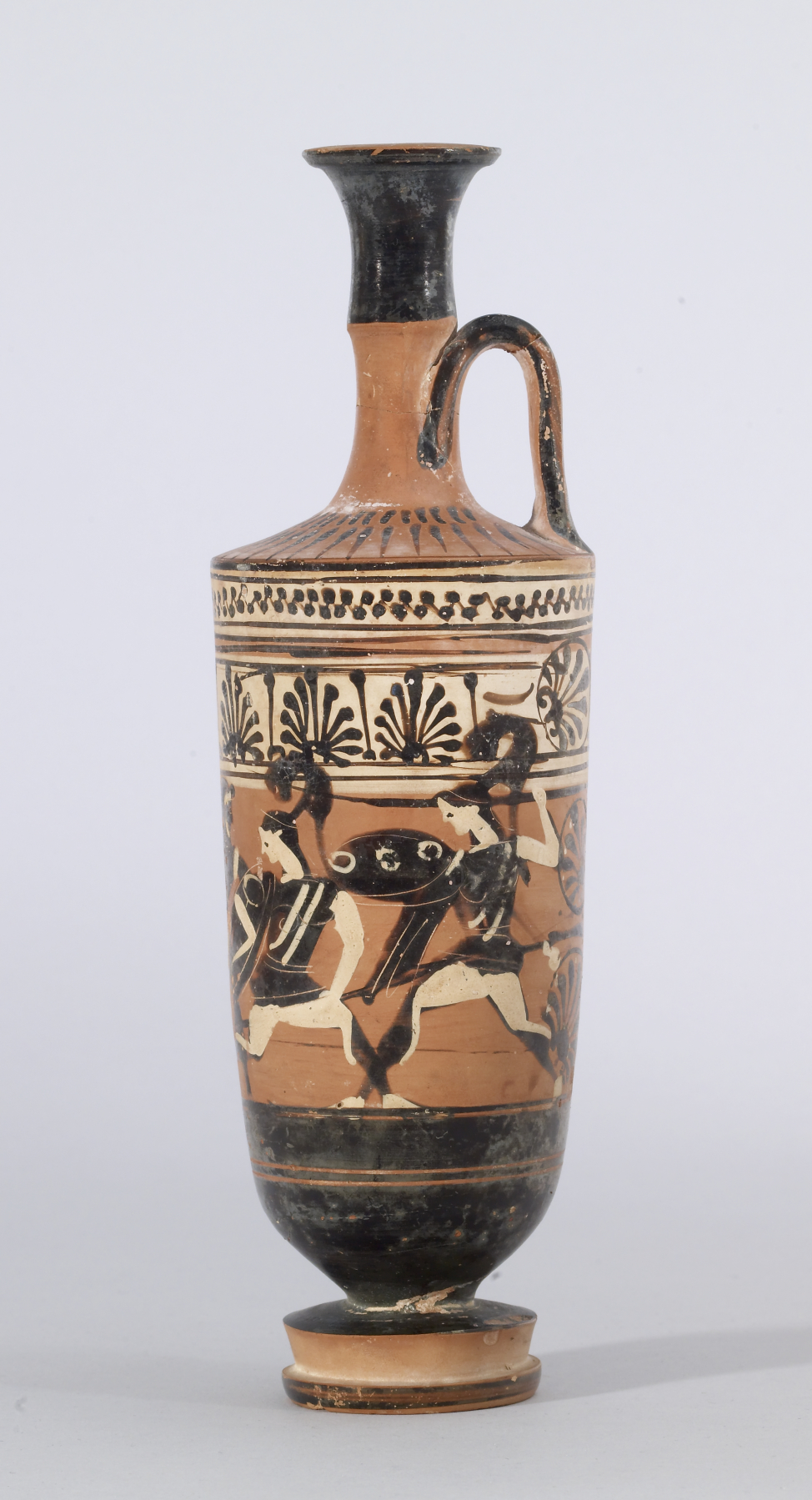
The Haimon Painter. Three Amazons and Herakles. Walters Art Museum.

The Haimon painter was a anonymous 5th-century BC Ancient Greek painter and draughtsman, so named by C.H.E. Haspels and John Beazley on account of a recurring subject in his black-figure vase painting—the Sphinx and its victim, the last of whom—according to a Greek myth—was Haimon. His name is unknown, but individual characteristics of style suggest the existence of a unique artistic personality. He specialized mostly in lekythoi and was closely related in manner to other contemporary Athenian vase-painters.
