= Chigi vase =

Protocorinthian painted vase

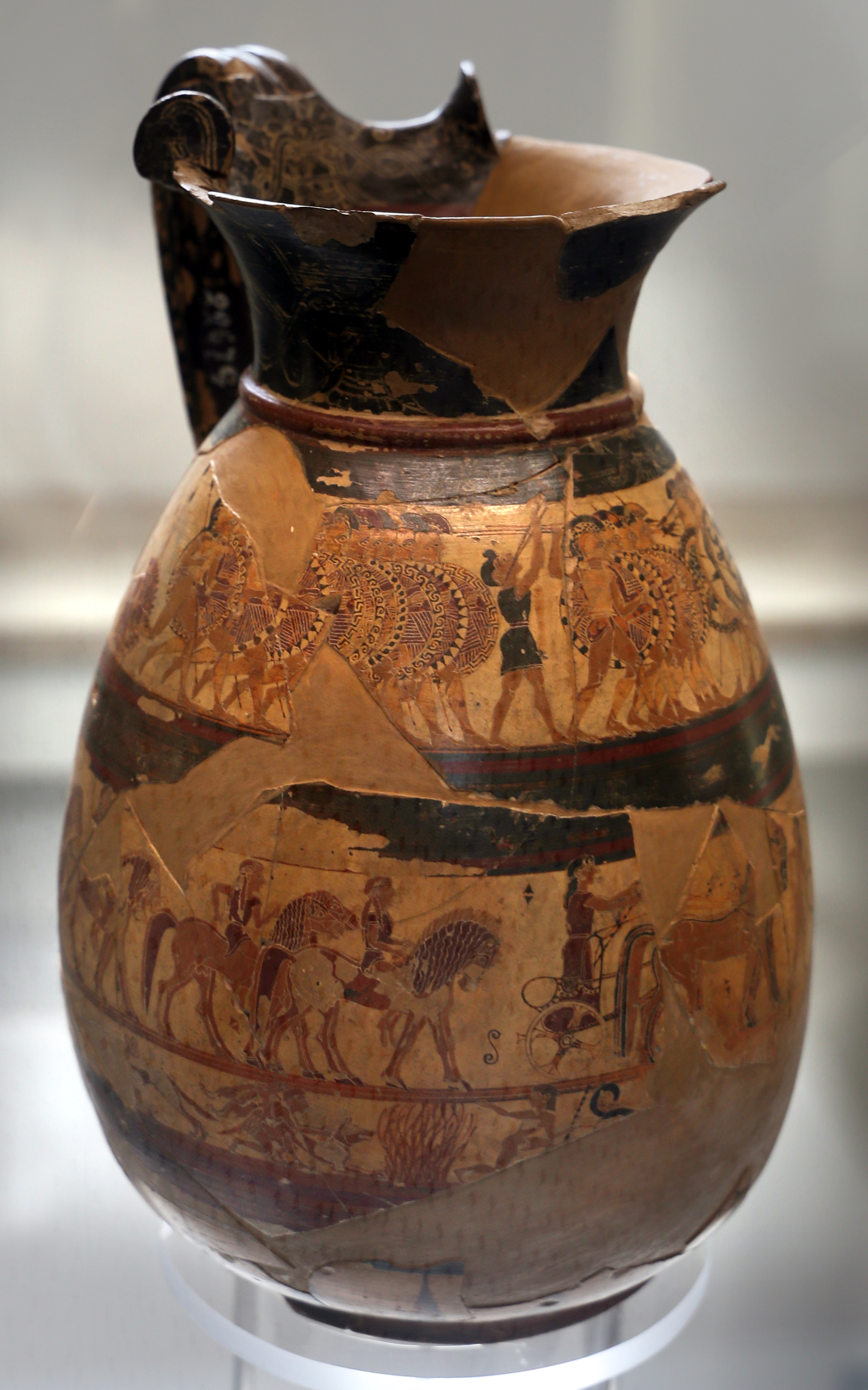
- Hoplites on the Chigi vase
- Material: Clay
- Height: 26 cm
- Created: c. 645 BC
- Discovered: 1881; Italy
- Present location: Rome, Lazio, Italy

The Chigi vase is a Proto-Corinthian olpe, or pitcher, that is the name vase of the Chigi Painter. It was found in an Etruscan tomb at Monte Aguzzo, near Veio, on Prince Mario Chigi's estate in 1881. The vase has been variously assigned to the middle and late Proto-Corinthian periods and given a date of c. 650–640 BC; it is now in the National Etruscan Museum, Villa Giulia, Rome (inv. No.22679).

The vase stands 26 cm (10.2 inches) tall, which is modest compared to other Greek vases. Some three-quarters of the vase is preserved. It was found amidst a large number of potsherds of mixed provenance, including one bucchero vessel inscribed with five lines in two early Etruscan alphabets announcing the ownership of Atianai, perhaps also the original owner of the Chigi vase.

The vase depicts the Judgement of Paris, and it is the earliest known depiction of this myth in art. It is thought to be adapting scenes from the Cypria, a lost epic poem.

== Mythological scenes ==
The Chigi vase itself is a polychrome work decorated in four friezes of mythological and genre scenes and four bands of ornamentation; amongst these tableaux is the earliest representation of the hoplite phalanx formation – the sole pictorial evidence of its use in the mid- to late-7th century, and terminus post quem of the "hoplite reform" that altered military tactics.

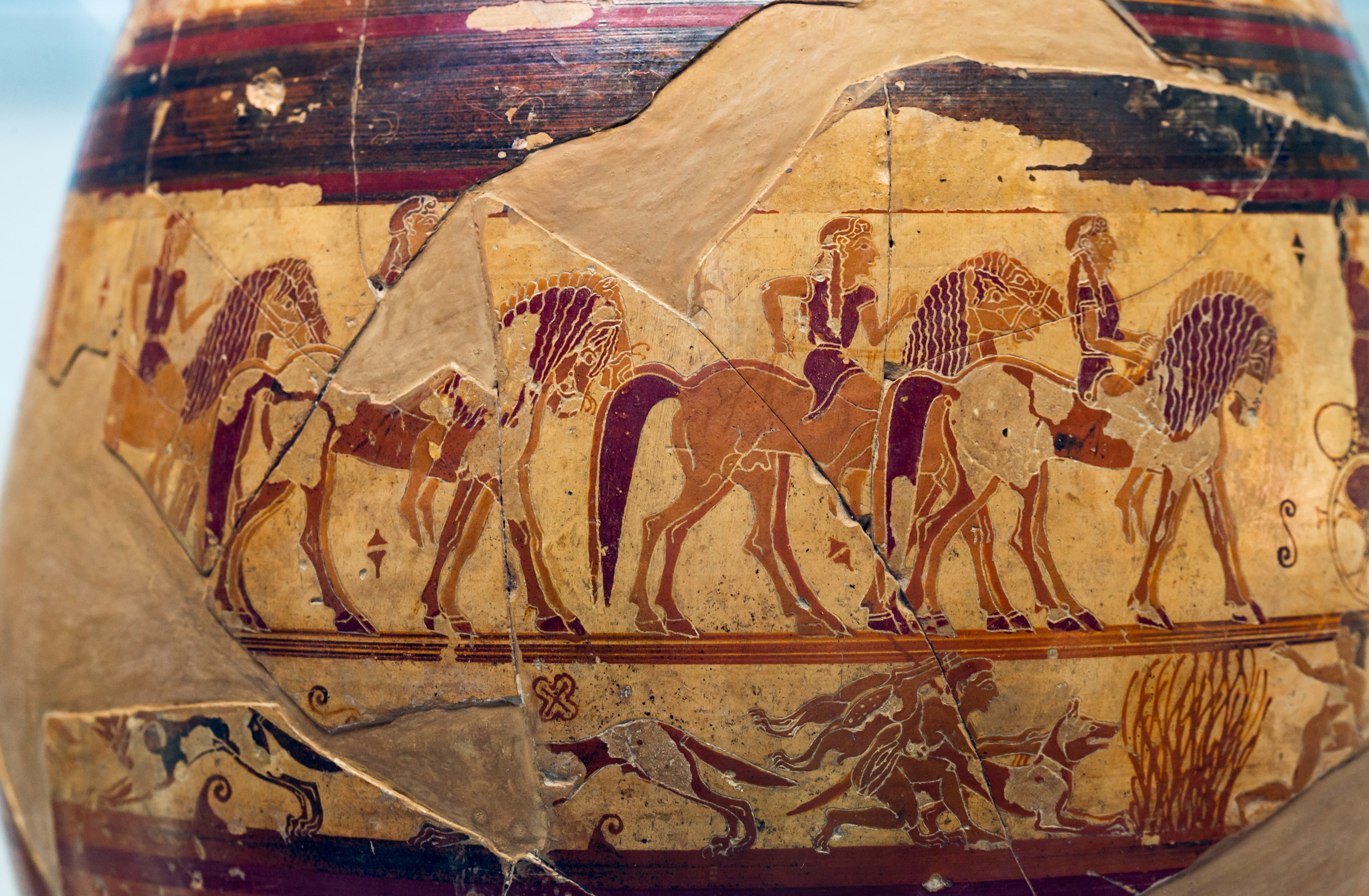
Detail

The lowest frieze is a hunting scene in which three naked short-haired hunters and a pack of dogs endeavour to catch hares and one vixen; a kneeling hunter carries a lagobolon (a throwing cudgel used in coursing hares) as he signals to his fellows to stay behind a bush. It is not clear from the surviving fragments if a trap is being used, as was common in depictions of such expeditions. The next frieze immediate above suggests a collocation of four or five unrelated events. First a parade of long-haired horsemen, each of whom is leading a riderless horse. Possibly these are squires or hippobates for some absent cavalrymen or hippobateis; the latter, it has been conjectured, may be the hoplites seen elsewhere on the vase. The riders are confronted with a two-bodied sphinx with a floral crown and an archaic smile. It is not clear if the creature is participating in any of the action in this frieze.

Behind the sphinx is a lion-hunting scene in which four youths wearing cuirasses (save for one who is nude, but belted) spear a lion which has a fifth figure in its jaws. Whether there were indigenous lions in the Peloponnese at this time is a matter for speculation. moreover the shock-haired mane of the lion betrays a neo-Assyrian influence, perhaps the first such in Corinthian art and replacing the previously dominant Hittite forms. Finally in this section, and just below the handle, is a Judgement of Paris scene. Above is another hunting scene, albeit of animals only: dogs chasing stags, goats and hares.

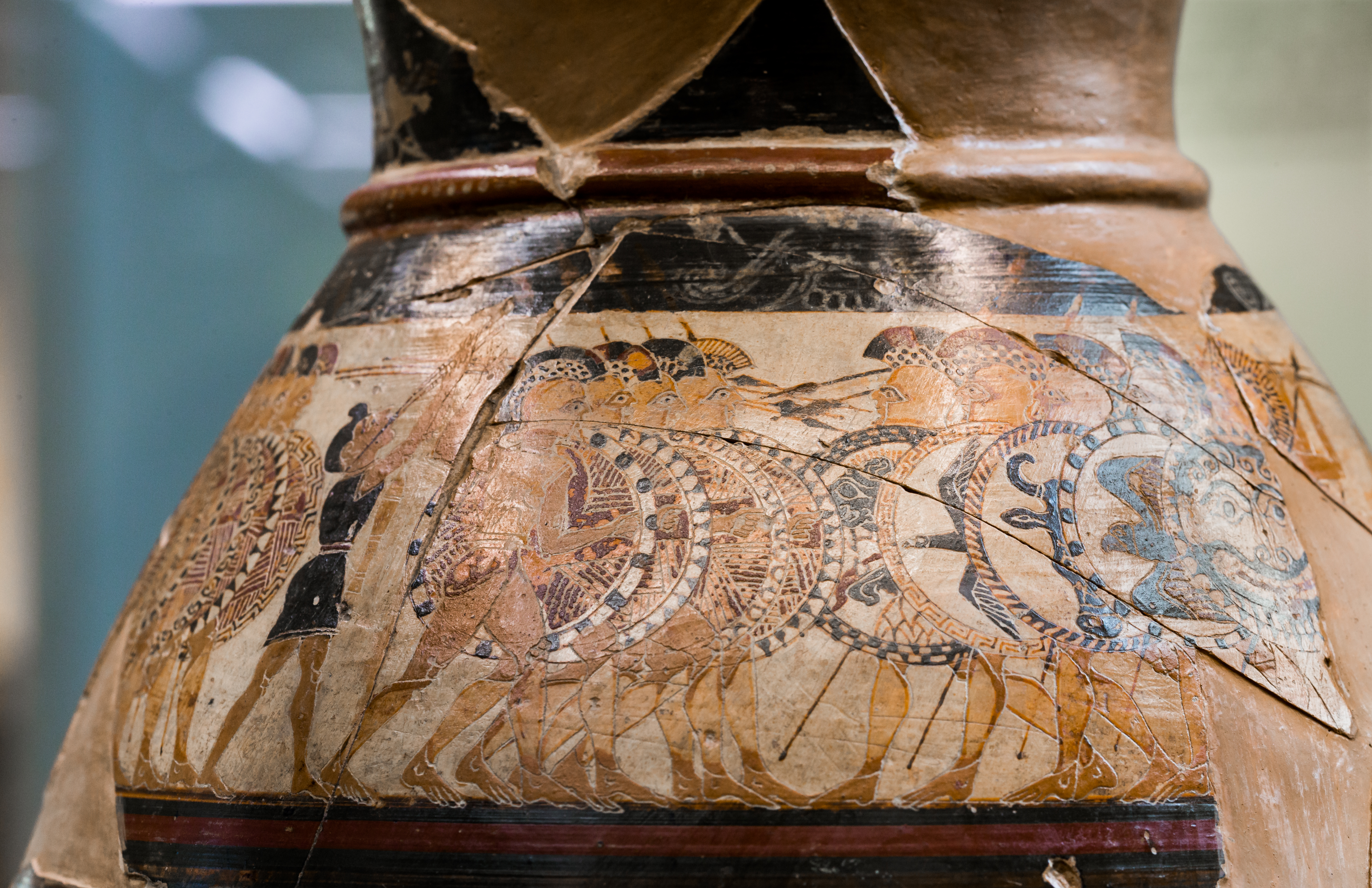
Detail of the Chigi Vase depicting hoplites in action (National Etruscan Museum, Rome)

In the highest and largest frieze is the scene that has attracted the most scholarly attention – a battle involving hoplite warfare. However this characterization is not without its problems. For one thing, the hoplites shown here meeting at the moment of othismos (or "push") do not carry short swords, but instead like their Homeric forebears have two spears; one for thrusting and one for throwing. Further, Tyrtaeus (11.11–14 West) does not mention a supporting second rank as it may be represented; it is far from self-evident this is a second rank depicted on the vase or that it supports the first. To render the phalanx tactics unambiguously the painter would have had to have given a bird's-eye view of the action, a perspective unknown in Greek vase painting. Consequently, it is not clear if the hoplite formation shown here is the developed form as it was practiced from the 6th century onwards.

Lastly aulos-players and cadenced marching are not attested in literature from the Archaic Period, so the aulos-player drawn here cannot have served in reality to keep the troops in step: what function he had, if any, is open to speculation. However, Thucydides does state that a Spartan phalanx in the Battle of Mantinea was accompanied by aulos-players in order to keep step as they approached the opposing army, which may suggest that they were used in the same way at the time when the vase was made.

== Judgement of Paris ==
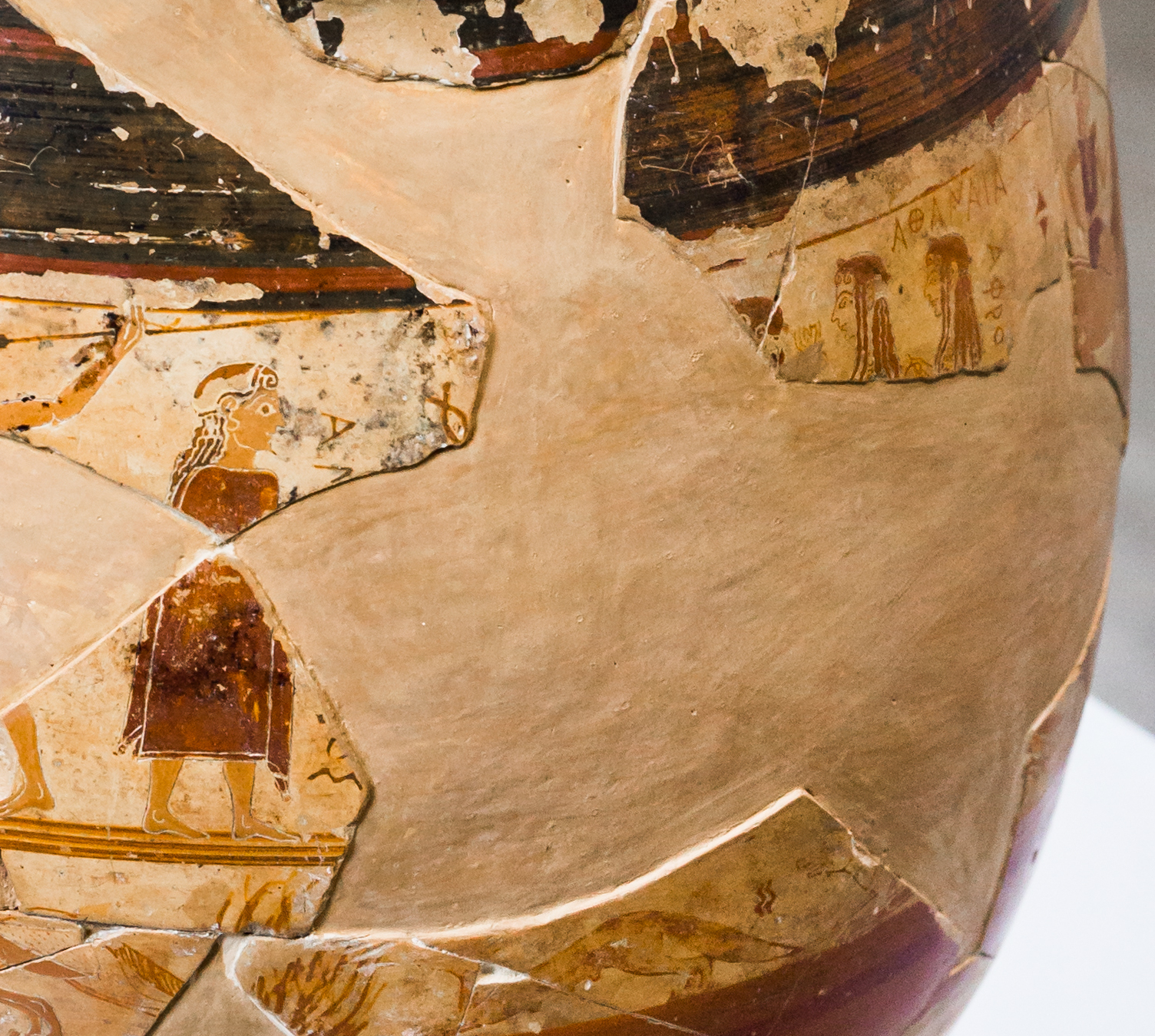
Judgement of Paris scene

The scene with the Judgement of Paris on the Chigi vase is the earliest extant depiction of the myth, evidence perhaps of knowledge of the lost epic Cypria from the 650s BC. Most of the scene, especially the bodies of the three goddesses, is lost. The largely complete figure of Paris is labelled Alexandros in the Homeric manner, though the writer might not be the same as the painter since the inscriptions are not typically Corinthian.

This scene, obscured under the handle, with most of the painted area lost, and “painted somehow as an afterthought” according to John Boardman. invites the question whether the events on this vase (and vases generally) are random juxtapositions of images or present a narrative or overarching theme.

In line with recent scholarship of the Paris structuralist school, Jeffrey Hurwit suggests that reading upwards along the vertical axis we can discern the development of the ideal Corinthian man from boyhood through agones and paideia to full warrior-citizen, with the sphinx marking the liminal stages in his maturation.

== Sources ==
- D. A. Amyx, Corinthian Vase Painting of the Archaic Period, 1988.
- Jeffrey M. Hurwit, "Reading the Chigi Vase", Hesperia, Vol. 71, No. 1 (Jan. – Mar., 2002), pp. 1–22.
- John Salmon, "Political Hoplites?", The Journal of Hellenic Studies, Vol. 97, (1977), pp. 84–101.
