= Municipality of Ljubno =

Municipality of Slovenia

Municipality of Ljubno Občina Ljubno
- Municipality
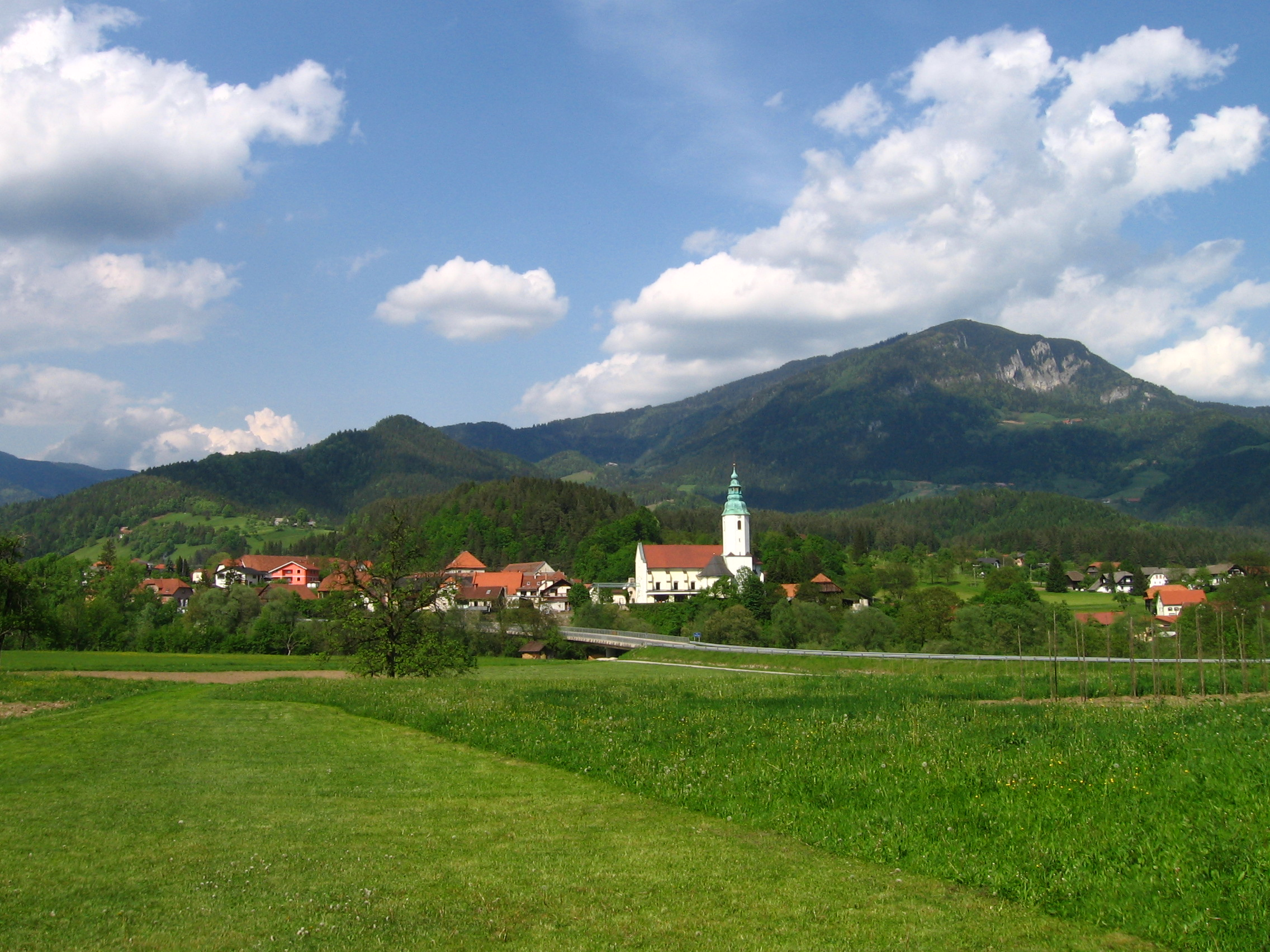

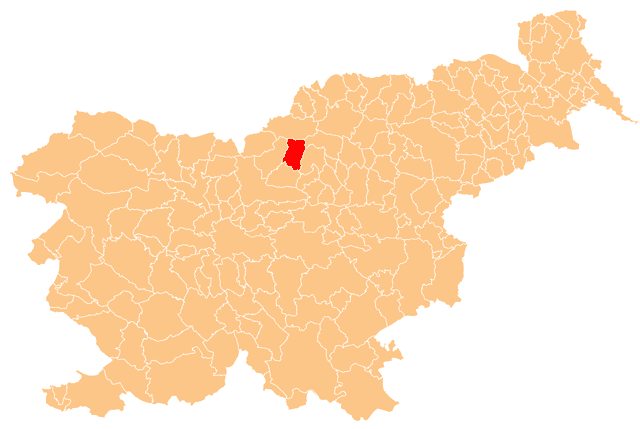
- Location of the Municipality of Ljubno in Slovenia
- Coordinates: 46°12′N 14°30′E
- Country: Slovenia

Government
  - Mayor: Franjo Naraločnik (Independent)

Area
  - Total: 78.9 km^{2} (30.5 sq mi)

Population (2002)
  - Total: 2,701
  - Density: 34.2/km^{2} (88.7/sq mi)
- Time zone: UTC+01 (CET)
  - Summer (DST): UTC+02 (CEST)
- Website: www.ljubno.si
- Source: Statistical Office of the Republic of Slovenia, census of 2002.

The Municipality of Ljubno (pronounced [ˈljuːbnɔ]; Slovene: Občina Ljubno) is a municipality in northern Slovenia. The seat of the municipality is the town of Ljubno ob Savinji.

== Settlements ==
In addition to the municipal seat of Ljubno ob Savinji, the municipality also includes the following settlements:

- Juvanje
- Meliše
- Okonina
- Planina
- Primož pri Ljubnem
- Radmirje
- Savina
- Ter
