= Melisa (disambiguation) =

Melisa is a genus of moths.

Melisa may also refer to:

- MELISA, a type of blood test
- Melisa (name), female given name

== People ==
- Melisa Akarsu (born 1993), Turkish swimmer
- Melisa Arévalo (born 1980), Argentine tennis player
- Melisa Aslı Pamuk (born 1991), Dutch-Turkish beauty pageant titleholder
- Melisa Can (born 1984), U.S. born Turkish basketball player
- Melisa Melai Cantiveros (born 1988), Filipina actress, comedian and host
- Melisa Döngel (born 1999), Turkish actress and model
- Melisa Ertürk (born 1993), Turkish-Canadian women's footballer
- Melisa Filis (born 2002), English footballer
- Melisa López Franzen (born 1980), American politician
- Melisa Gil (born 1984), Argentine sports shooter
- Melisa Gretter (born 1993), Argentine basketball player
- Melisa Güneş (born 2001), Turkish weightlifter
- Melisa Hasanbegović (born 1995), Bosnian footballer
- Melisa Kerman (born 1994), Turkish volleyball player
- Melisa Matheus (born 1998), Namibian footballer
- Melisa Michaels (1946–2019), American author
- Melisa Miranda (born 1988), Chilean tennis player
- Melisa Moses (born 1972), American diver
- Melisa Murillo (born 1982), Colombian athlete
- Melisa Nicolau (born 1984), Spanish footballer
- Melisa Şenolsun (born 1996), Turkish actress
- Melisa Sözen (born 1985), Turkish actress
- Melisa Upu (born 1974), New Zealand softball player
- Melisa Wallack (born 1968), American screenwriter and film director
- Melisa Whiskey, British-Nigerian Afropop singer
- Melisa Zhdrella, (born 2000), Kosovan swimmer

== See also ==
- Melissa (disambiguation)
- Melise (disambiguation)
