= Melisa (name) =

- Gender: Feminine
- Language: Turkish

Origin
- Language: Greek
- Meaning: Honey bee

Other names
- Related names: Melissa

Melisa is a common feminine Turkish given name.

== People ==
=== Given name ===
- Ege Melisa Bükmen (born 2004), Turkish volleyballer
- Melisa Abimbola, a British–Nigerian Afropop singer and songwriter
- Melisa Akarsu (born 1993), a Turkish swimmer competing in the butterfly events
- Melisa Arévalo (born 1980), an Argentine former professional tennis player
- Melisa Bester, a South African-born Australian singer-songwriter and musician
- Melai Cantiveros (born 1988; Melisa Bunayog Cantiveros-Francisco), a Filipino comedian, television personality and actress
- Melisa Dilber Ertürk (born 1993), a women's football midfielder playing in Canada and the United States
- Melisa Döngel (born 1999), a Turkish actress and model
- Mel Filis (born 2002; Melisa Katie Filis), a professional footballer who plays as a midfielder
- Melisa López Franzen (born 1980), an American politician and former member of the Minnesota Senate
- Melisa Gil (born 1984), an Argentine sports shooter
- Melisa Gretter (born 1993), an Argentine basketball player for Campinas Basquete Clube and the Argentina women's national basketball team
- Melisa Güneş (born 2001), a Turkish weightlifter competing in the women's –45 kg division
- Melisa Hasanbegović (born 1995), a Bosnian football defender who plays for SC Braga
- Melisa Kerman (born 1994), a Turkish female volleyball player
- Melisa Matheus (born 1998), a Namibian footballer who plays as a goalkeeper
- Melisa C. Michaels (1946–2019), an American science fiction and mystery author
- Melisa Miranda-Otarola (born 1988), a Chilean former professional tennis player
- Melisa Moses (born 1972), a former American diver
- Melisa Murillo (born 1982), a retired Colombian athlete who specialised in sprinting events
- Melisa Nicolau (born 1984), a Spanish former footballer, who played as a defender for Primera División clubs Rayo Vallecano and FC Barcelona
- Melisa Ramos (born 1997; Melisa Alejandra Ramos Pérez), a Mexican professional footballer
- Melisa Rollins (born 1995), an American professional racing cyclist who placed 5th at the Unbound 200 mile gravel race in 2022
- Melisa Şenolsun (born 1996), a Turkish actress
- Melisa Sözen (born 1985), a Turkish actress
- Melisa Upu (born 1974), a New Zealand softball player
- Melisa Wallack, an American screenwriter and film director
- Melisa Aslı Yazıcı, a Dutch-Turkish actress, model and beauty pageant titleholder
- Melisa Zhdrella (born 2000), a Kosovan swimmer
