= Melissa (disambiguation) =

Melissa is a given name for a female, meaning "honey bee" in the Greek language.

Melissa may also refer to:

== People ==
- Melissa (philosopher), Pythagorean philosopher
- Melissa (singer) (born 1982), Lebanese singer
- Cheerleader Melissa (born 1982), American professional wrestler
- Melissa Aronson (born 1963), professionally known as "Emme", supermodel/activist
- Melissa Barrera (born 1990), Mexican actress and singer
- Melissa Benoist (born 1988), American actress
- Melissa Brannen (born 1984), a kidnapping victim
- Melissa Coates (born 1969), Canadian professional wrestler
- Melissa Errico (born 1970), American singer
- Melissa Etheridge (born 1961), American singer
- Melissa George (born 1976), Australian actress
- Melissa Gilbert (born 1964), American actress
- Melissa Gregory (born 1981), American figure skater
- Melissa Grelo (born 1977), Canadian television personality
- Melissa Haney (born 1981), Inuk air pilot from Quebec, Canada
- Melissa Joan Hart (born 1976), American actress
- Missy Hyatt (born 1963), American professional wrestling manager
- Melissa Horn (born 1987), Swedish singer
- Melissa Kuys (born 1987), Australian rules footballer
- Melissa Lawson (born 1976), American singer
- Melissa M (born 1985), French singer
- Melissa Manchester (born 1951), American singer
- Melissa Moore (disambiguation), multiple people
- Melissa Nobles (born 1963), American political scientist and academic administrator
- Melissa O'Neil (born 1988), Canadian singer
- Lady Melissa Percy (born 1987), English fashion designer
- Melissa Ricks (born 1990), Filipina actress
- Melissa Rivers (born 1968) American actress/producer
- Melissa Straker (born 1976), Barbadian athlete
- Melissa Sagemiller (born 1974), American actress
- Melissa Tkautz (born 1974), Australian actress
- Melissa Ann Tremblay (1977–1988), American female murder victim
- Melissa VanFleet (born 1986), American singer-songwriter

== Places ==
=== Canada ===
- Melissa, Ontario, a community in Muskoka Region

=== Greece ===
- Cape Melissa, a cape on the island of Ithaca, Ionian Islands
- Melissa, Elis, a municipal district in Elis, West Greece
- Melissa, Karditsa, a village in Karditsa regional unit, Thessaly
- Melissa, Kavala, a village in Kavala regional unit, East Macedonia and Thrace
- Melissa, a village in the municipal unit Kileler, Larissa regional unit, Thessaly
- Melissa, Xanthi, a village in Xanthi regional unit, East Macedonia and Thrace

=== Italy ===
- Melissa, Calabria, a comune in the province of Crotone

=== United States ===
- Melissa, Texas, a city in Collin County
- Melissa, West Virginia

== Entertainment ==
=== Characters ===
- Melissa, a character in the movie The Hangover
- Melissa, a character in British soap opera Hollyoaks
- Melissa, a character in the Mighty Morphin Power Rangers episode Different Drum
- Melissa, a character in the Gilbert and Sullivan comic opera Princess Ida
- Melissa, a character in the Seinfeld episode The Apology
- Melissa Fitzgerald, a character in the 2013 American crime comedy movie We're the Millers
- Melissa Hastings, a character in the 2006 American drama series Pretty Little Liars

=== Music ===
- Melissa, the house band for The Late Late Show with James Corden
- Melissa (Melissa Manchester album), 1975
- Melissa (Mercyful Fate album), 1983
- "Melissa" (song), by the Allman Brothers Band
- "Mélisa", a song by French singer Enrico Macias
- "Melissa", a 1983 song by Mercyful Fate
- "Melissa", a 2003 single by Porno Graffitti

=== Other entertainment ===
- Melissa (novel), by Alex Gino, originally published as George in 2015
- Melissa (1964 TV series), a British television series
- Melissa (1997 TV series), a British television series

== Other uses ==
- MELiSSA, a project to develop a plant based ecosystem
- Melissa (chimpanzee), a Tanzanian chimpanzee
- Melissa (computer virus), a computer virus
- Melissa (crater), a crater on the far side of the Moon
- Melissa (plant), a genus of flowering plants in the family Lamiaceae
- Melissa (sorceress), a fictional sorceress in the legendary history Matter of France
- Melissa (wine), an Italian wine from the province of Crotone
- Melissa River, a river of Paraná state in southern Brazil
- List of storms named Melissa

== See also ==
- Melisa (disambiguation)
