= Technological Educational Institute of Thessaly =

Defunct tertiary education institute in Greece

Coordinates: 39.627°N 22.380°E

Technological Educational Institute of Karditsa
- Τεχνολογικό Εκπαιδευτικό Ίδρυμα Καρδίτσας
- Type: Public; Higher Education; Greece University System; University of Applied Sciences
- Established: 2019 – Abolished; 2013 – TEI of Thessaly; 1983 – TEI of Larissa
- Location: Larissa, Karditsa, Trikala, Thessaly, Greece
- Website: www.teilar.gr

The Technological Educational Institute of Thessaly or TEI of Thessaly (Greek: Τεχνολογικό Εκπαιδευτικό Ίδρυμα (Τ.Ε.Ι.) Θεσσαλίας, Technologikó Ekpaideutikó Idryma (T.E.I.) Thessalias; formerly Technological Educational Institute of Larissa, Τεχνολογικό Εκπαιδευτικό Ίδρυμα (Τ.Ε.Ι.) Λάρισας, Technologikó Ekpaideutikó Idryma (T.E.I.) Larissas, TEILAR) was a Greek public educational institute abolished in January 2019, law 4589, Government Gazette 13 Α'/29.01.2019. Its former main campus and administrative centre was in Larissa, with satellite campuses in Trikala and Karditsa.

== History ==
The TEI of Thessaly was established as a tertiary education institution in 1983 (under Act 1404/83) along with all Greek Technological Educational Institutes. In 2001 (under Act 2916/2001) the TEI of Thessaly was established as a Higher Education institution, in compliance with the Bologna declaration, and abolished in 2019 (defunct) Law 4589/29.01.2019, its faculties absorbed by the University of Thessaly (UTH).

== Schools and departments ==
The "ATHENA" Reform Plan restructured Higher Education programmes in 2013.

The institute comprises four Schools, consisting of fifteen Departments.

Schools	Departments
School of Agricultural Technology	Department of Agricultural Engineering Technologists; Department of Biosystems Engineering; Department of Forestry and Natural Environment Administration; Department of Food Technology (Karditsa); Department of Nutrition and Dietetics (Karditsa)
School of Technological Applications	Department of Mechanical Engineering; Department of Electrical Engineering; Department of Computer Science and Telecommunications; Department of Infrustructure Engineering; Department of Civil Engineering (Trikala); Department of Furniture Design and Technology (Karditsa)
School of Business and Economics	Department of Business Administration; Department of Accounting and Finance
School of Health and Welfare Professions	Department of Nursing; Department of Medical Laboratories

The institution also offers several Master programmes.

== Academic evaluation ==
In 2016 the external evaluation of the institution cited TEI of Thessaly as Worthy of merit.

An external evaluation of all academic departments in Greek universities was conducted by the Hellenic Quality Assurance and Accreditation Agency (HQA).

== See also ==
- Fachhochschule (FH)
- List of universities in Greece
- List of research institutes in Greece
- University of Thessaly, a university located in the region of Thessaly, established in 1984.
