= Paliouri =

Paliouri (Greek: Παλιούρι) may refer to the following settlements in Greece:

- Paliouri, Chalkidiki, a village in Chalkidiki
- Paliouri, Evros, a village in the municipality Didymoteicho, Evros regional unit
- Paliouri, Karditsa, a village in the municipal unit Kallifoni, Karditsa regional unit
- Paliouri, Magnesia, a village in the municipal unit Aisonia, Magnesia
- Paliouri, Phthiotis, a village in the municipality Makrakomi, Phthiotis
