= Melise =

Melise may refer to:

- Meliše, a village in Ljubno, Slovenia
- Malese Jow (born 1991), American actress

== See also ==
- Malise (disambiguation)
- Melisa (disambiguation)
