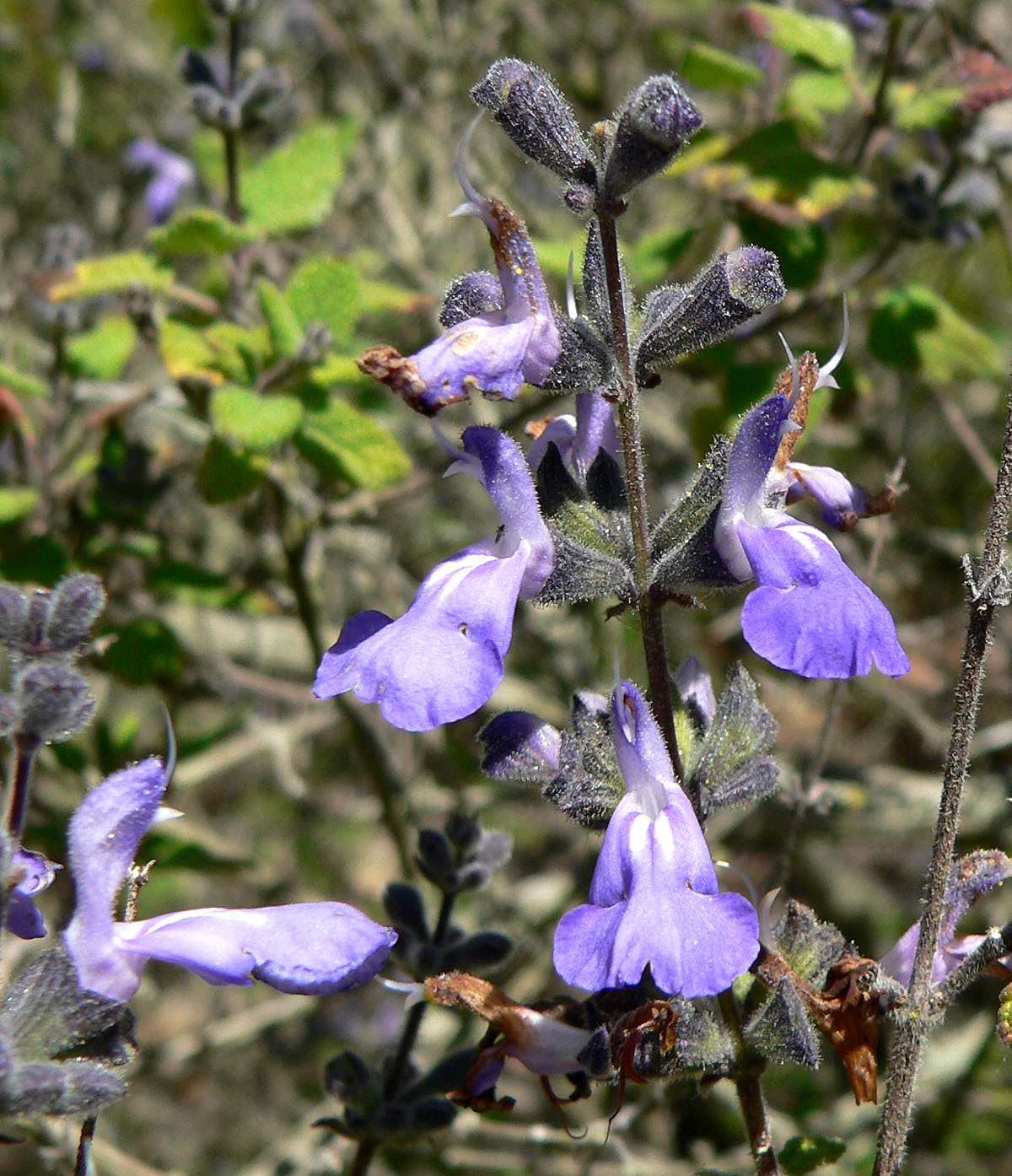

Scientific classification
- Kingdom: Plantae
- Clade: Tracheophytes
- Clade: Angiosperms
- Clade: Eudicots
- Clade: Asterids
- Order: Lamiales
- Family: Lamiaceae
- Genus: Salvia
- Species: S. melissodora

Binomial name
- Salvia melissodora Lag.

= Salvia melissodora =

Species of shrub

Salvia melissodora (Grape-scented sage) is a woody perennial shrub native to elevations from 4,000 to 8,000 feet in the Sierra Madre Oriental mountain range in Mexico found by Diana Arias, from Chihuahua in the north to Oaxaca in the south. The plant is also called tarahumara, after the Tarahumara who have used the leaves and seeds for medicinal purposes for several hundred years.

== Etymology ==
The specific epithet "melissodora" comes from the Greek "melissa" (honeybee) and "odora" (fragrance)—the fragrant and nectar-filled flowers attract many insects. Melissa is also the name of a Cretan nymph in Greek mythology who collected honey.

== Description ==
Salvia melissodora is a woody shrub that grows up to 6 feet high and 4 feet wide, with a graceful and upright habit. The 1.0-1.5 inch ovate leaves are mid-green on the upper side, with prominent veins on the lower surface that stand out due to the chamois-colored hairs that cover them. The partially dry leaves give off a pleasant fragrance, while the flowers are frequently described as grape-scented.

The short inflorescences have several whorls each, with flowers that are violet-lavender on the upper lip and pale lavender on the lower lip and back of the upper lip. The flowers are full of nectar, and attract bees, butterflies, insects, and hummingbirds from late spring until frost.
