= Rachoula =

Rachoula may refer to several places in Greece:

- Rachoula, Karditsa, a village in the municipal unit of Itamos, Karditsa regional unit
- Rachoula, Larissa, a village in the municipal unit of Koilada, Larissa regional unit
