= Okonina =

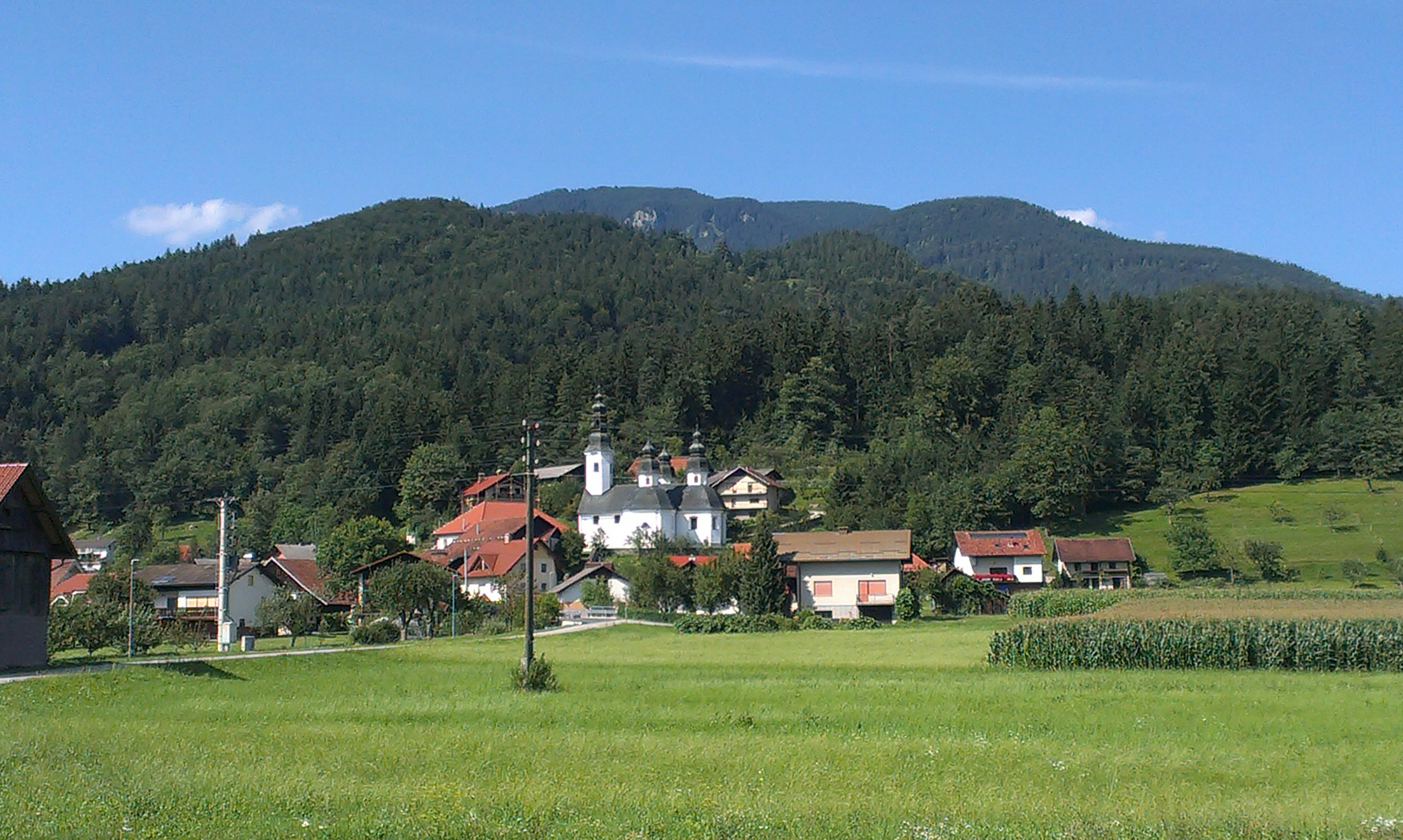

- Location in Slovenia
- Coordinates: 46°19′21.59″N 14°52′10.64″E
- Country: Slovenia
- Traditional region: Styria
- Statistical region: Savinja
- Municipality: Ljubno

Area
  - Total: 2.01 km^{2} (0.78 sq mi)
- Elevation: 387.7 m (1,272 ft)

Population (2019)
  - Total: 208

Okonina (pronounced [ɔkɔˈniːna]) is a settlement on the left bank of the Savinja River in the municipality of Ljubno in Slovenia. The area belongs to the traditional region of Styria and is now included in the Savinja Statistical Region.

The local church is dedicated to Saint James and belongs to the parish of Radmirje. It has a wide nave with two chapels in its transepts. It is mentioned in documents dating back to 1426, but the current building dates back to the 1720s.
