= Upu (disambiguation) =

Upu is a historical region surrounding Damascus.

Upu or UPU may also refer to:

- Upu, a village in Motusa, Fiji
- Melisa Upu (born 1974), New Zealand softball player
- Unpentunium, a hypothetical chemical element
- Universal Postal Union, a specialized agency of the United Nations
