= Boulouki =

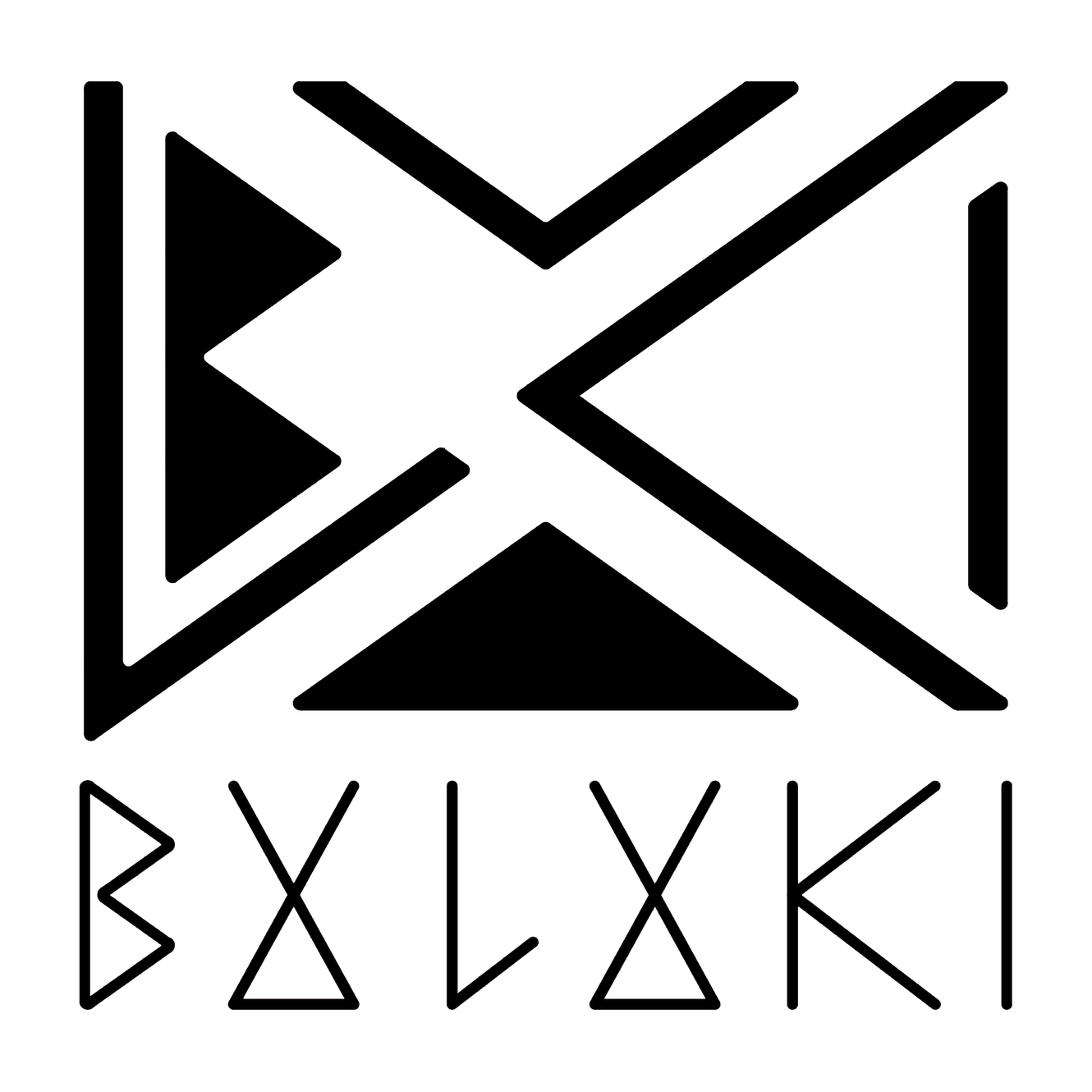
- Type: Non-profit organization
- Founded: 2018
- Headquarters: Athens, Greece
- Area served: Epirus, Cyclades
- Key people: Panos Kostoulas, Grigoris Koutropoulos, Christoforos Theoharis, Ionas Sklavounos, Mina Kouvara
- Website: boulouki.org/en/about

Boulouki (Greek: Το Μπουλούκι) is a Greek non-profit organization operating as a travelling workshop for traditional building practices in Greece and the Balkans.

As an interdisciplinary collective, it brings together architects, civil engineers, and researchers of cultural heritage, with the main aim of documenting, preserving, and revitalizing traditional building knowledge, techniques, and materials, particularly in stone and wood.

Since May 2018, Boulouki has operated as a civil non-profit company based in Athens, with a regional branch in Epirus. In June 2024, it was awarded the first European Cultural Heritage Award, Europa Nostra 2024, for its activities and overall contribution.

== Name ==
The term boulouki derives from the Turkish word bölük, meaning a group of people or a unit of workers. Historically, it referred to itinerant guilds of craftsmen and builders who travelled across Greece and the Balkans in search of work related to traditional construction, such as mansions, bridges, stone pavements, and timber structures.

== Activities ==
Boulouki identifies, documents, and records empirical and technical knowledge held by communities, groups, and individuals related to traditional construction techniques and materials. It aims to promote this knowledge through hands-on workshops and building projects in collaboration with local communities. Its activities also include research, the organization of workshops, symposia, and broader cultural and educational initiatives.

The organization has been active throughout Greece, particularly in the mountainous regions of Epirus, where prominent master craftsmen lived and worked, influencing building traditions across the Balkans. To achieve its goals, Boulouki has developed a broad network of collaborators, including major academic institutions in Greece, such as the National Technical University of Athens, Aristotle University of Thessaloniki, University of Patras, the University of Thessaly, and the University of Ioannina, along with academics of various disciplines and professional craftsmen.

Groups of recent engineering graduates and senior undergrad students of civil engineering and architecture participate in professional apprenticeships and technical seminars in traditional and sustainable building organized by Boulouki throughout Greece.

In 2024, Boulouki established the first "School of traditional and sustainable building training" in the mountainous village of Frasta, Tzoumerka, housed in a former primary school building granted by local authorities.

During the academic year 2025–2026, Boulouki members taught at the Department of Architecture of ETH Zurich, following an invitation by the Institute of Landscape and Urban Studies (LUS).

== Mission ==
- To collaborate with local communities and promotion of Greek cultural heritage, including issues related to its conservation and management.
- To raise awareness of the impacts of excessive tourism development and uncontrolled construction, particularly in insular regions of Greece.
- To promote local and traditional materials and construction techniques, especially stone and timber, as sustainable building practices for the 21st century.

== Awards ==
- European Cultural Heritage Award – Europa Nostra 2024
- Philippe Rotthier European Prize for Architecture, category “Integration into the Landscape”, 2024
- New European Bauhaus Prize “Boost for Small Municipalities”, jointly with the Municipality of Central Tzoumerka, 2025
- European Heritage Days Stories (2025)
