= Karditsomagoula =

Karditsomagoula Καρδιτσομαγούλα
- Community
- Location within Greece
- Coordinates: 39°23.5′N 21°55.4′E
- Country: Greece
- Administrative region: Thessaly
- Regional unit: Karditsa
- Municipality: Karditsa
- Municipal unit: Karditsa

Population (2021)
  - Community: 1,950
- Time zone: UTC+2 (EET)
  - Summer (DST): UTC+3 (EEST)
- Postal code: 431 00
- Area code: 24410
- Vehicle registration: ΚΑ

Karditsomagoula (Greek: Καρδιτσομαγούλα) is a large village in the Karditsa regional unit in Greece, with nearly 2,000 inhabitants. It is part of the municipality of Karditsa and is situated north of the central area of Karditsa, separated from it by the Greek National Road 30 (Arta - Trikala - Karditsa - Volos). It has a grid layout consisting of six 1,500-metre roads (North–South) and eleven 900-metre roads (East–West). It is located southeast of Trikala, southeast of Larissa, west of Palamas, northwest of Sofades, and northeast of the Plastiras Dam.

Farmlands dominate the area around Karditsomagoula, the main product being cotton covering 26,000 acres (105 square kilometres) of land. Other products include cattle, fruit and vegetables, and some flowers. The whole population prior to the late-20th century, and much of the population today, are farmers.

== Historical population ==
Historical population
Year	Pop.	±%
1981	2,458	—
1991	2,409	−2.0%
2001	2,232	−7.3%
2011	2,063	−7.6%
2021	1,950	−5.5%

== See also ==
- List of settlements in the Karditsa regional unit
