= Karditsa =

City in Thessaly, Greece

Karditsa Καρδίτσα
- Municipality
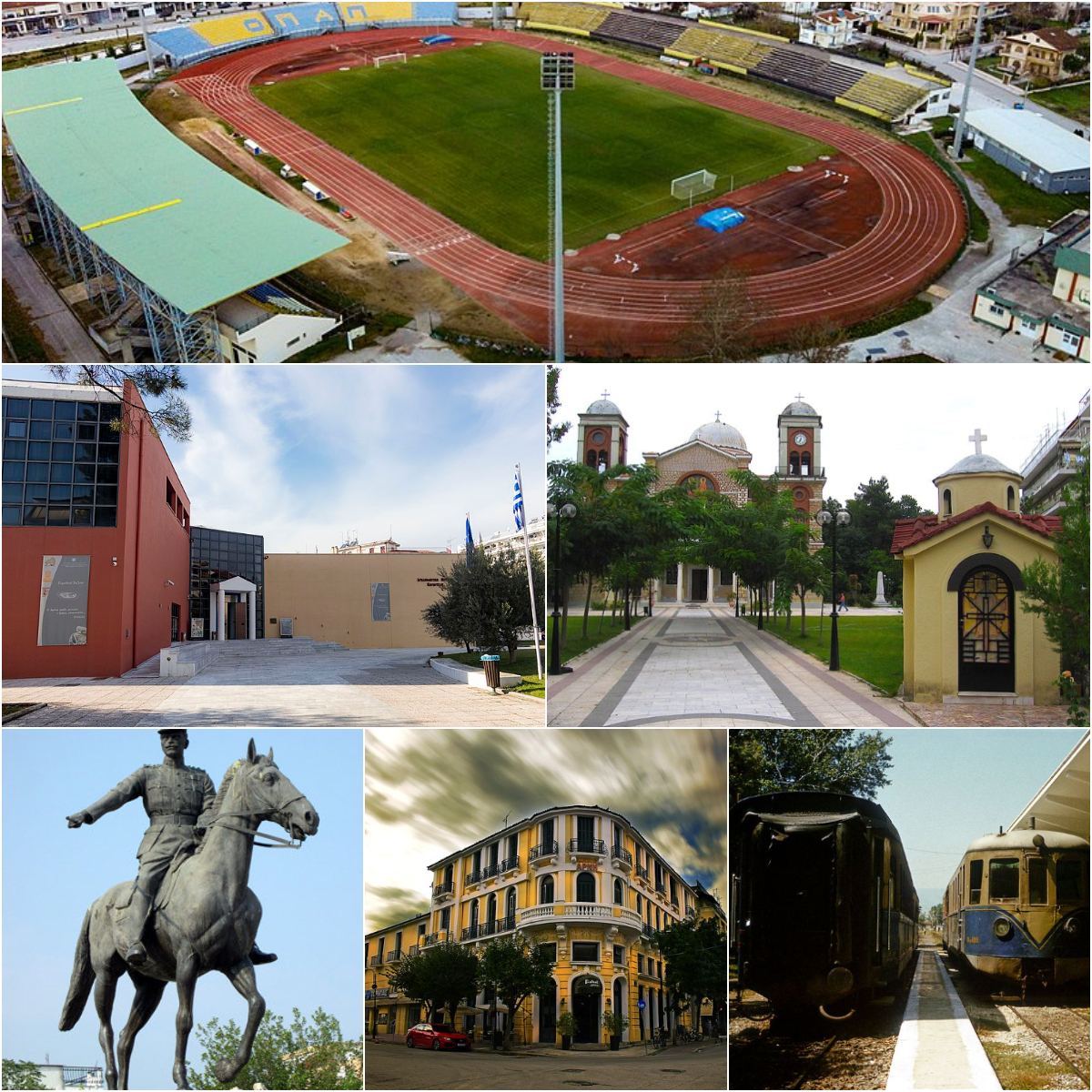

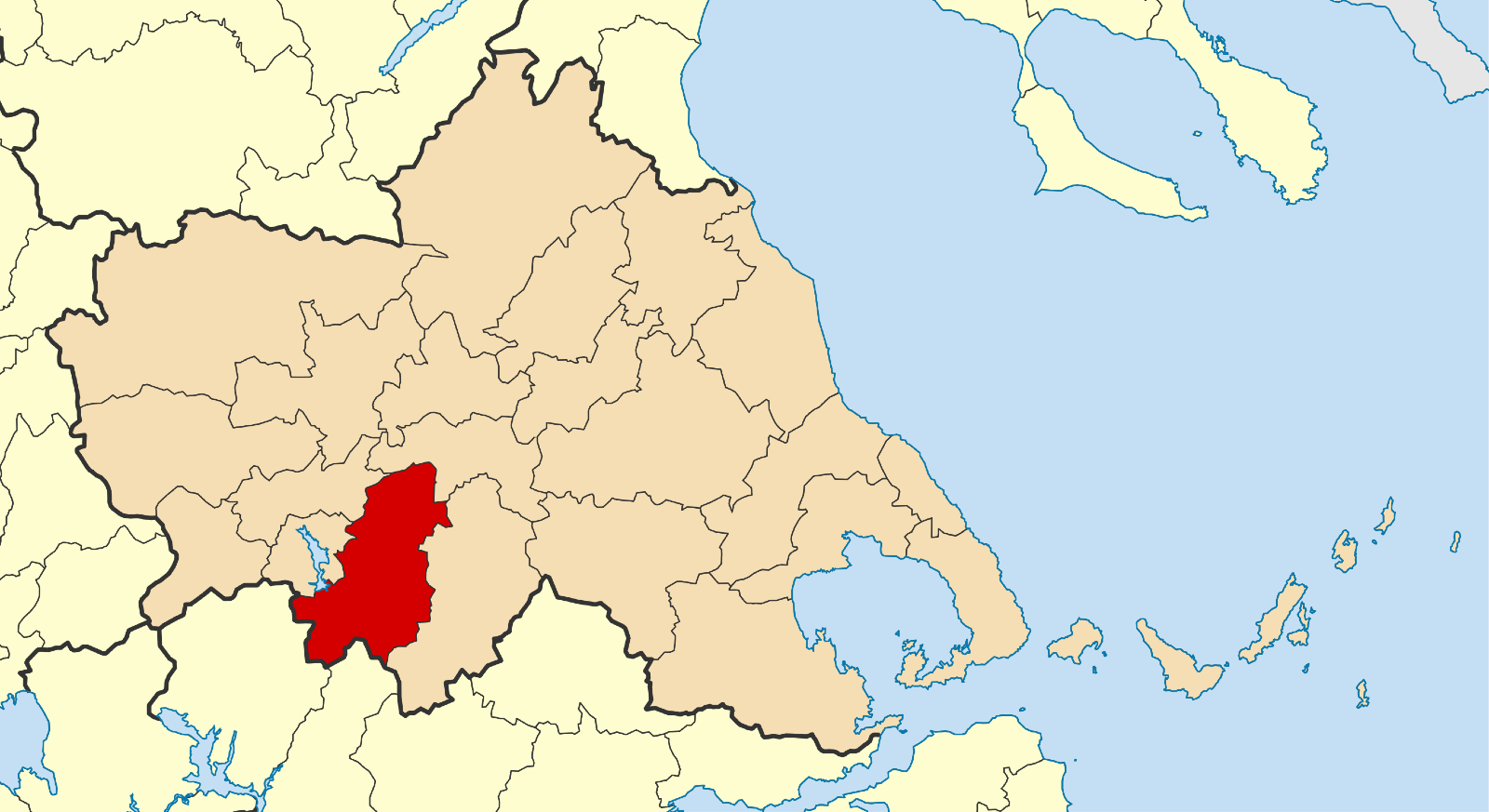

- Location within Greece
- Coordinates: 39°22′N 21°55′E
- Country: Greece
- Administrative region: Thessaly
- Regional unit: Karditsa

Government
  - Mayor: Vasileios Tsiakos (since 2019)

Area
  - Municipality: 647.4 km^{2} (250.0 sq mi)
  - Municipal unit: 110.1 km^{2} (42.5 sq mi)
- Elevation: 108 m (354 ft)

Population (2021)
  - Municipality: 55,979
  - Density: 86.47/km^{2} (223.9/sq mi)
  - Municipal unit: 44,700
  - Municipal unit density: 406/km^{2} (1,050/sq mi)
  - Community: 40,272
- Time zone: UTC+2 (EET)
  - Summer (DST): UTC+3 (EEST)
- Postal code: 431 00
- Area code: 24410
- Vehicle registration: ΚΑ
- Website: dimoskarditsas.gov.gr

Karditsa (Greek: Καρδίτσα, romanized: Kardítsa [karˈðitsa]) is a city in western Thessaly in mainland Greece. It is the largest city and the capital of the Karditsa regional unit. According to the 2021 census, the municipality of Karditsa has a population of 55,979, of whom 40,272 live within the city limits of Karditsa.

== History ==
During the period of Ottoman rule in Thessaly, the main settlement in the location of modern Karditsa was called Sotira. In 1810, the English traveler William Martin Leake mentioned a sprawling village named Kardhítza, consisting of between 500-600 houses, of which the majority of the inhabitants were Turkish.

Karditsa was incorporated as a new city in 1882, the year after its liberation from the Ottoman Empire (1881).

During World War II, the resistance in Thessaly was fought primarily by the ELAS. On March 12, 1943 Karditsa was liberated temporarily by ELAS after the Italian capitulation.

In September 2020, the city was badly hit from catastrophic floods that resulted in 4 deaths.

== Municipality ==
The municipality Karditsa was formed at the 2011 local government reform by the merger of the following 5 former municipalities, that became municipal units:

- Itamos
- Kallifoni
- Kampos
- Karditsa
- Mitropoli

The municipality has an area of 647.3878 km^{2}, the municipal unit 110.086 km^{2}. Formerly, Karditsa had a neighbourhood known as Vlachomachalas, which was populated by Vlachs (Aromanians).

=== Subdivisions ===
The municipal unit of Karditsa is divided into six parts (communities):

- Agiopigi
- Artesiano
- Karditsa
- Karditsomagoula
- Palioklissi
- Rousso

== Historical population ==
Year	Community	Municipal unit	Municipality
2001	35,971	41,411	-
2011	39,119	44,002	56,747
2021	40,272	44,700	55,979

== Climate ==
Karditsa has a hot-summer Mediterranean climate (Köppen climate classification: Csa), and typically experiences hot, dry summers and cool winters with substantial precipitation.

Climate data for Karditsa
Month	Jan	Feb	Mar	Apr	May	Jun	Jul	Aug	Sep	Oct	Nov	Dec	Year
Mean daily maximum °C (°F)	10.25 (50.45)	13.54 (56.37)	11.76 (53.17)	20.28 (68.50)	25.29 (77.52)	30.73 (87.31)	32.31 (90.16)	31.39 (88.50)	27.78 (82.00)	21.85 (71.33)	15.33 (59.59)	10.36 (50.65)	20.91 (69.63)
Daily mean °C (°F)	5.36 (41.65)	6.83 (44.29)	10.49 (50.88)	14.86 (58.75)	19.85 (67.73)	25.59 (78.06)	26.68 (80.02)	25.38 (77.68)	21.73 (71.11)	15.95 (60.71)	10.38 (50.68)	6.47 (43.65)	15.80 (60.43)
Mean daily minimum °C (°F)	1.94 (35.49)	2.81 (37.06)	5.28 (41.50)	8.65 (47.57)	13.08 (55.54)	16.28 (61.30)	17.75 (63.95)	17.29 (63.12)	13.91 (57.04)	10.50 (50.90)	5.49 (41.88)	2.46 (36.43)	9.62 (49.32)
Average precipitation mm (inches)	82.64 (3.25)	77.22 (3.04)	59.32 (2.34)	62.20 (2.45)	45.88 (1.81)	19.50 (0.77)	14.01 (0.55)	16.78 (0.66)	26.91 (1.06)	91.44 (3.60)	90.18 (3.55)	91.01 (3.58)	677.09 (26.66)
Mean monthly sunshine hours	113.51	122.05	165.50	206.01	267.05	330.90	333.92	310.91	237.76	170.41	121.35	102.84	2,482.21
Source: Hellenic National Meteorological Service

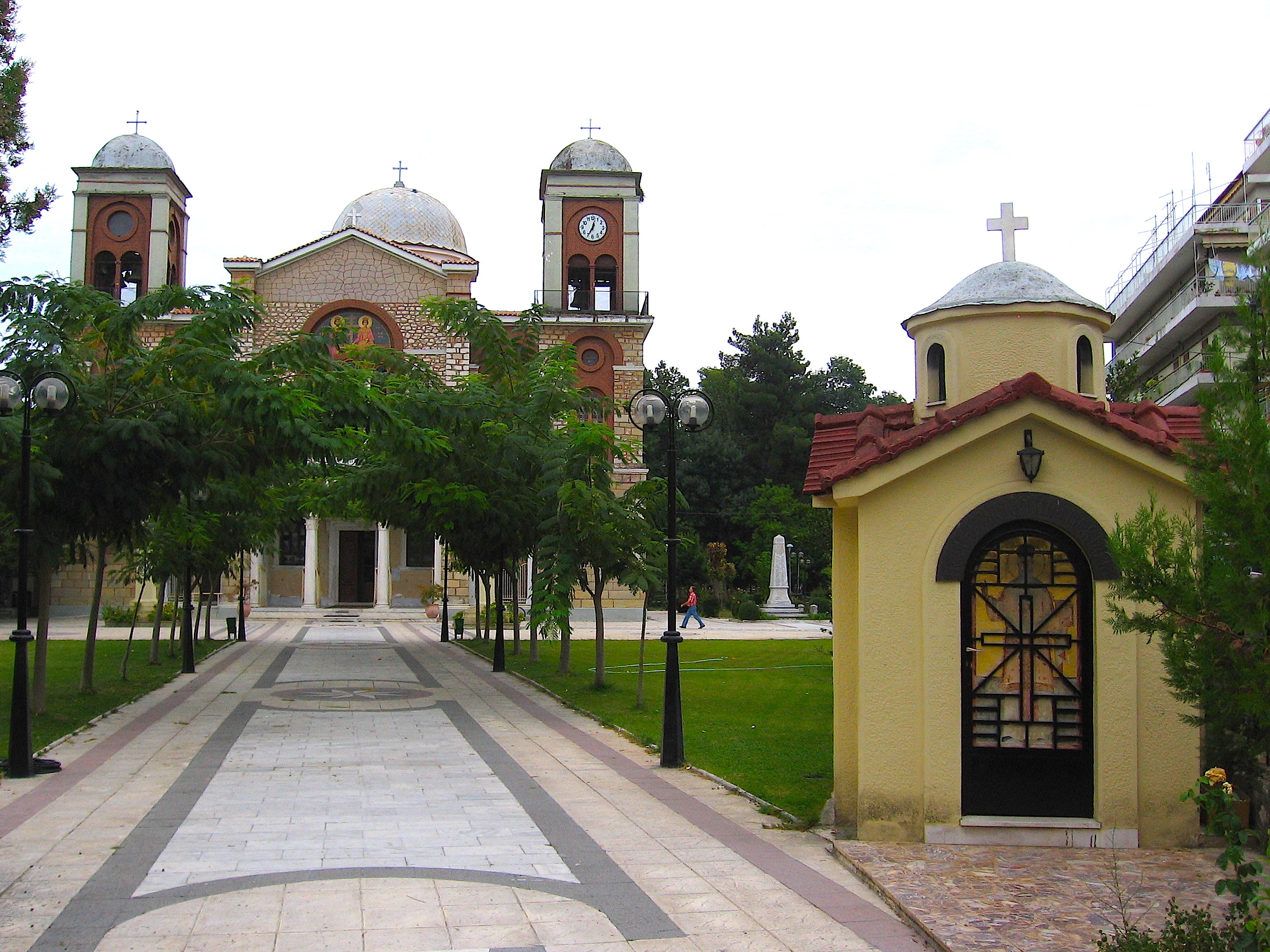
View of the cathedral church of Saints Constantine and Helen.

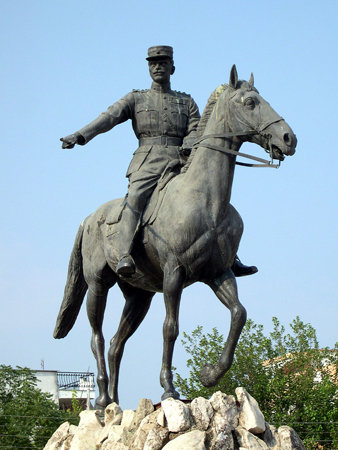
Statue of Nikolaos Plastiras (1883-1953) in Karditsa.

== Education ==
The Department of Veterinary Medicine of the University of Thessaly -one of two Veterinary departments in Greece- and three other university departments of the University of Thessaly are based in the city.

== Transport ==
Karditsa is served by trains on the Palaiofarsalos-Kalambaka line, with connections to both Athens and Thessaloniki.

== Sports ==
Football clubs include Anagennisi Karditsa, AO Karditsa, Asteras Karditsa and Elpides Karditsas. ASK Karditsa is a basketball club and SPA Karditsa (el) is a volleyball club.

Sport clubs based in Karditsa
Club	Founded	Sports	Achievements
Anagennisi Karditsas	1904	Football	Presence in Super League 2
AO Karditsa	1966	Football	Earlier presence in Beta Ethniki
Asteras Karditsa	1980	Football	Earlier presence in Gamma Ethniki
ASK Karditsa	2006	Basketball	Presence in Alpha Ethniki
SPA Karditsa	1987	Volleyball	Presence in A2 Ethniki volleyball
Elpides Karditsas	1994	Football	Earlier presence in A Ethniki women

== Notable people ==
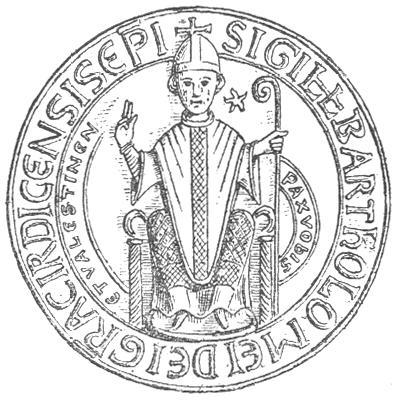
Seal of Bartholomew, Latin Bishop of Karditsa and Velestino in the early 13th century

The two most prominent personalities of Greek history, who came from Karditsa, were the marshals–fighters:

- Georgios Karaiskakis, military commander and a leader of the Greek War of Independence
- Nikolaos Plastiras, general, politician and prime minister of Greece

Τhe Greek archbishop, Seraphim of Athens was also born and raised in Karditsa.

Other notable people associated with Karditsa are the following ones:

=== Politics ===
- Georgios Siantos, politician and Greek Resistance figure
- Charilaos Florakis, politician and leader of the Communist Party of Greece (KKE)
- Theodoros Anagnostopoulos, politician and member of parliament
- Evripidis Kafantaris, politician and writer
- Dimitris Sioufas, politician and former minister
- Kostas Tsiaras, politician and former minister
- Spyros Taliadouros, politician and former deputy minister
- Spyridon Lappas, politician and member of parliament

=== Arts and music ===
- Dimitris Yioldasis, artist and painter
- Helena Paparizou, singer and winner of 2005 Eurovision Song Contest
- Giorgos Valtadoros, painter and short story writer
- Thomas Bakalakos, composer and mathematician
- Pantelis Sabaliotis, painter, sculptor, and curator
- Fotini Velesiotou, rebetiko singer
- Dionysis Tsaknis, composer, lyricist, and singer
- Mimis Gioulekas, rebetiko and folk singer
- Efi Thodi, traditional Greek and pop music singer

=== Sports ===
- Labros Papakostas, high jumper and medalist at the World Indoor Championships
- Stefanos Tsitsipas, professional tennis player
- Konstantinos Thanos, wrestler and Olympic medalist
- Ioannis Bourousis, basketball Greek national team player
- Sakis Tsiolis, footballer and football manager
- Vaios Karagiannis, footballer
- Antigoni Drisbioti, race walker and gold medalist at European Championships
- Dimitrios Tsiamis, triple jumper and bronze medalist at European Championships
- Alexandros Papamichail, Olympic race walker
- Dimosthenis Tampakos, gymnast and Olympic gold medalist
- Panagiota Tsinopoulou, Olympic race walker

=== Sciences ===
- Vassilis Papazachos, professor and seismologist
- Evanthia Galanis, professor of oncology and molecular medicine
- Vaios T. Karathanos, professor at the Harokopio University
- Christos Pitsavos, cardiologist and emeritus professor at the University of Athens
- George Mantanis, professor and fellow of the IAWS and HAA
- Polycarpos Falaras, physicist and distinguished researcher at Demokritos Research Centre
- Thanasis Jamurtas, professor at the University of Thessaly
- Thanos Karathanos, chemist and oenologist

== See also ==
- Fanari, Karditsa

== Gallery ==
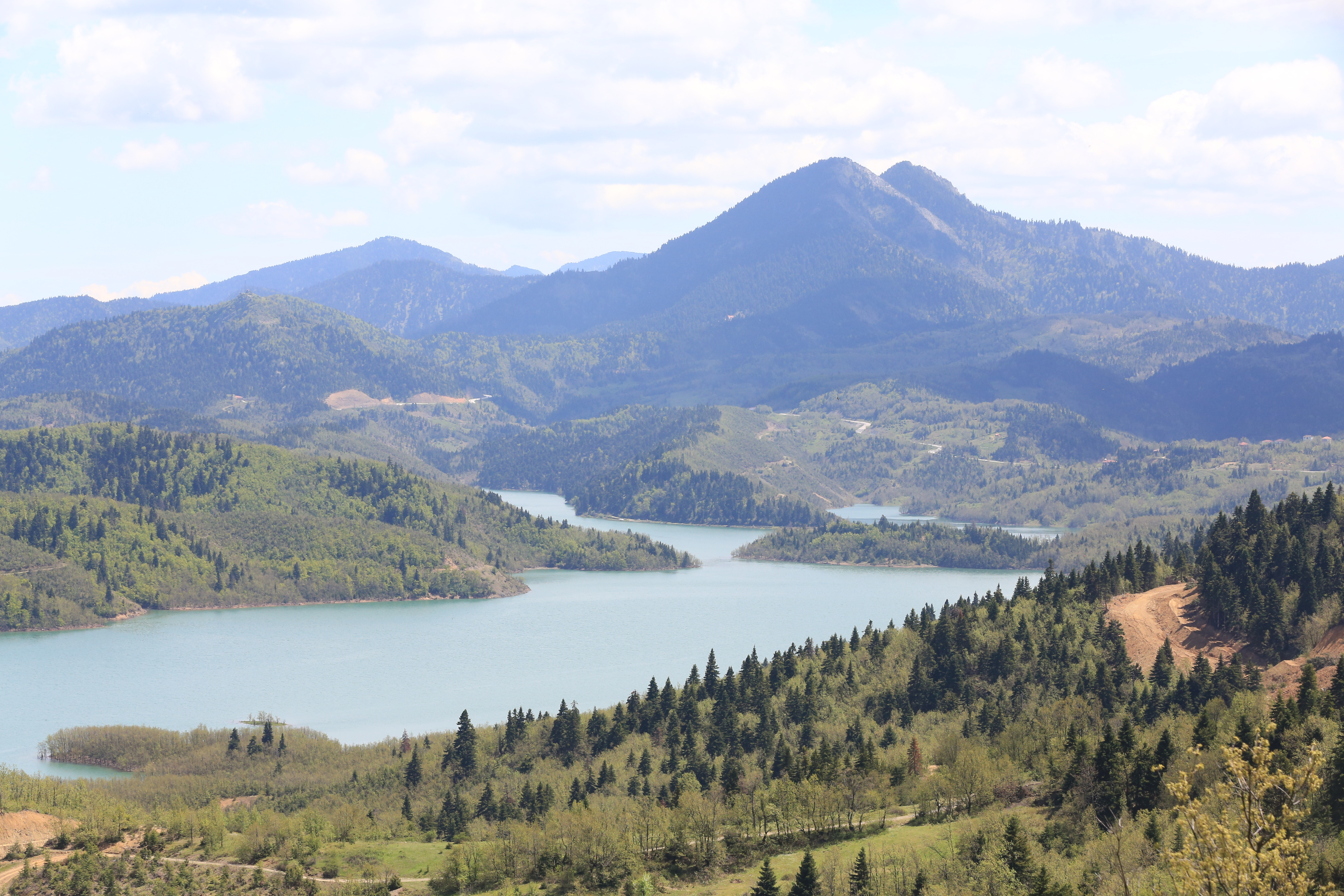
Lake Plastiras, near the city

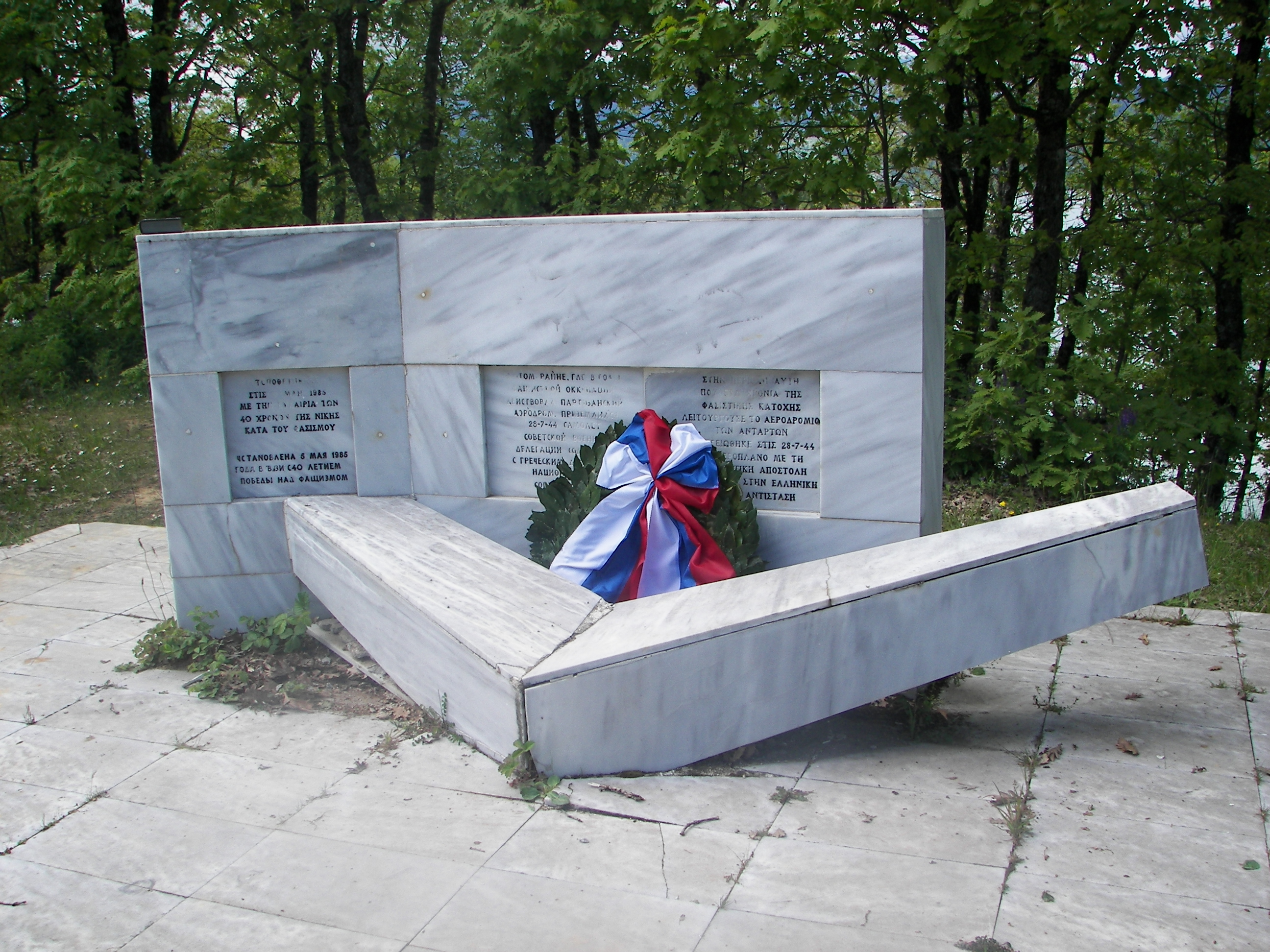
Monument to Greco-Russian friendship at Lake Plastira

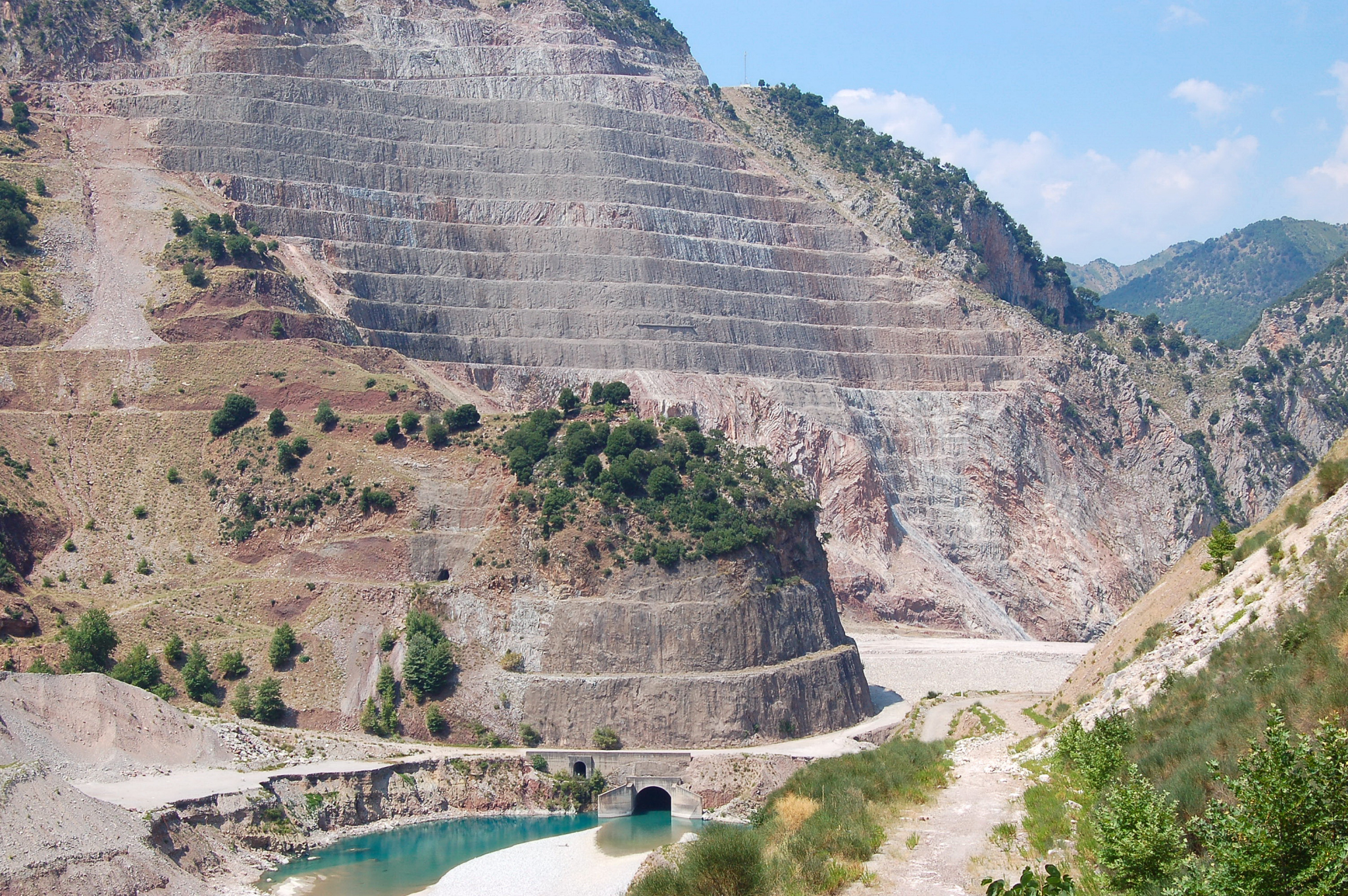
Dam of Sykia

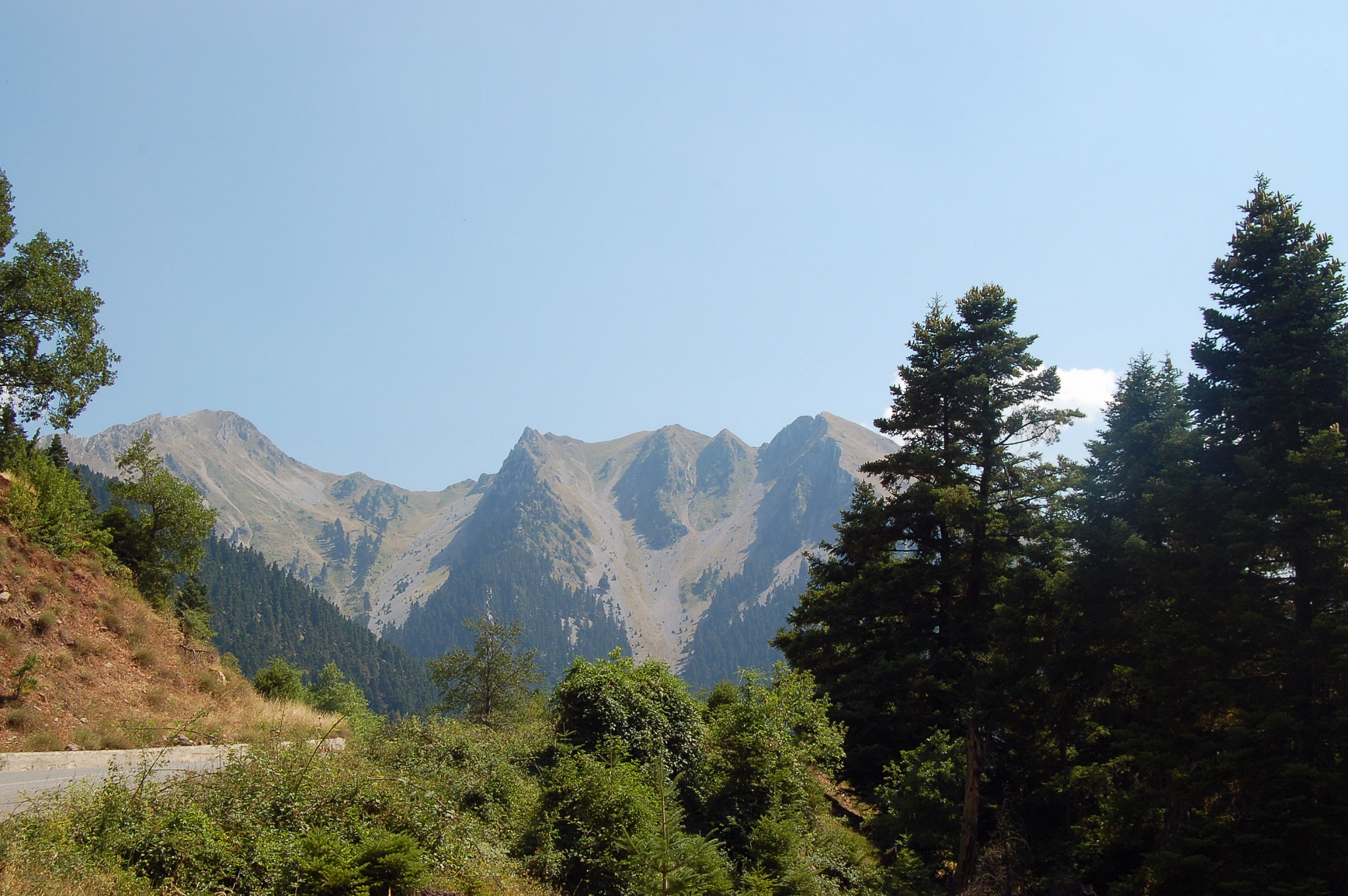
View to Argithea

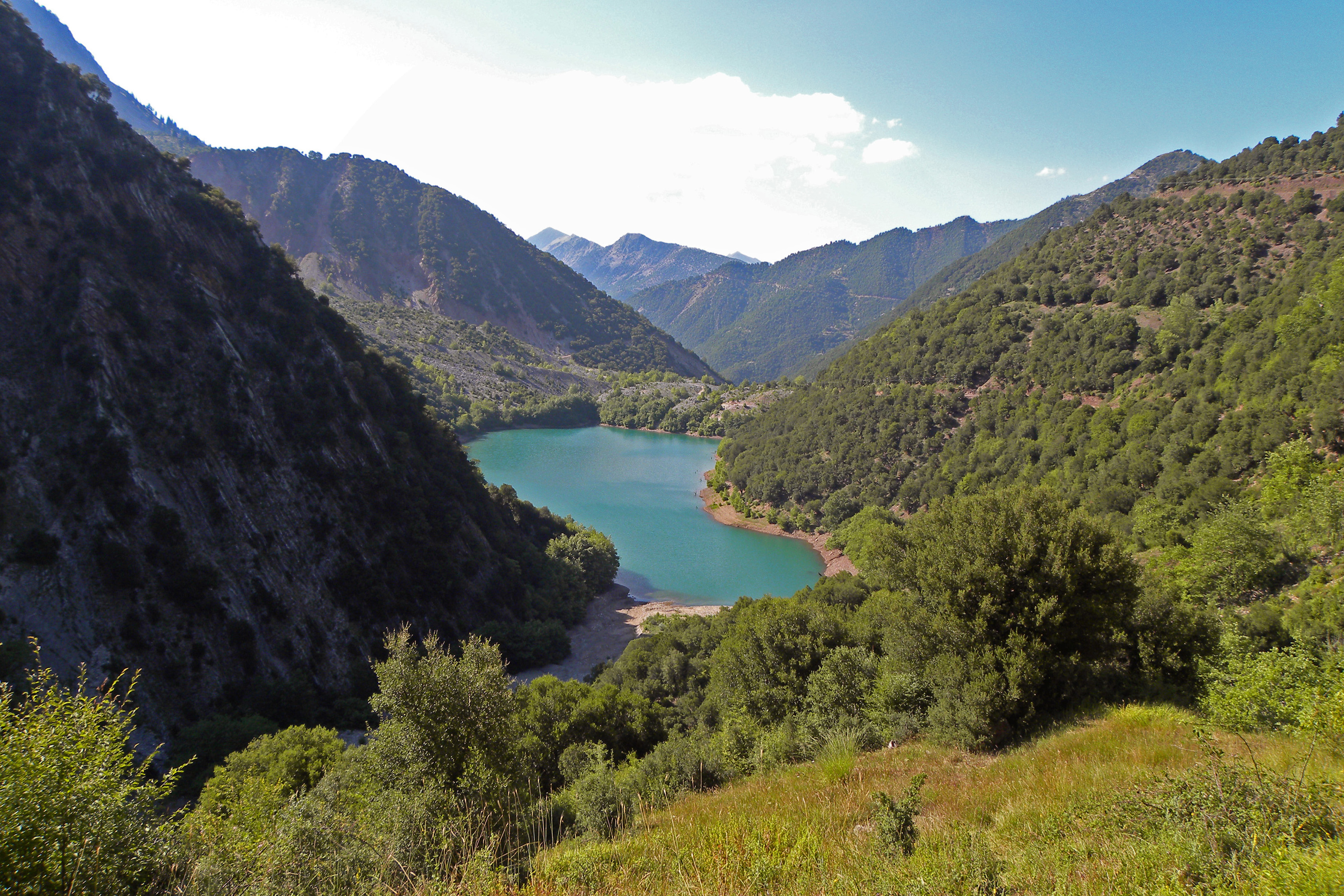
Stefaniada lake
