= Ter, Ljubno =

Ter
- Location in Slovenia
- Coordinates: 46°21′3.48″N 14°50′21.93″E
- Country: Slovenia
- Traditional region: Styria
- Statistical region: Savinja
- Municipality: Ljubno

Area
  - Total: 23.18 km^{2} (8.95 sq mi)
- Elevation: 518.6 m (1,701 ft)

Population (2019)
  - Total: 222

Ter (pronounced [ˈtɛːɾ], German: Thörberg) is a dispersed settlement in the hills northeast of Ljubno ob Savinji in Slovenia. The area belongs to the traditional region of Styria and it is now included in the Savinja Statistical Region.
