= Planina, Ljubno =

Planina
- Location in Slovenia
- Coordinates: 46°23′44.48″N 14°50′37.33″E
- Country: Slovenia
- Traditional region: Styria
- Statistical region: Savinja
- Municipality: Ljubno

Area
  - Total: 16.7 km^{2} (6.4 sq mi)
- Elevation: 923 m (3,028 ft)

Population (2002)
  - Total: 96

Planina (pronounced [plaˈnìːna]) is a dispersed settlement in the hills north of Ljubno ob Savinji in Slovenia. The area belongs to the traditional region of Styria and is now included in the Savinja Statistical Region.
