= Mellisa =

Mellisa is a feminine given name; similar to Melissa. Notable people with the name include:

- Mellisa Hollingsworth (born 1980), Canadian athlete
- Mellisa Santokhi-Seenacherry, First Lady of Suriname

== See also ==
Mellisai Mannar another name for M. S. Viswanathan
