= Melissa =

Female given name

- Pronunciation: /məˈlɪsə/
- Gender: Feminine

Origin
- Language: Greek
- Meaning: Honey bee
- Region of origin: Greece

Other names
- Related names: Melita, Mel, Melina, Melisa, "Mia", Meliza, Missy

Melissa is a feminine given name. The name comes from the Greek word μέλισσα (mélissa), "bee", which in turn comes from μέλι (meli), "honey". In Hittite, melit signifies "honey". Melissa is a common variant form, with others being Malissa, Melesa, Melessa, Meliza, Mellisa, Melosa, and Molissa.

According to Greek mythology, perhaps reflecting Minoan culture, making her the daughter of a Cretan king Melisseus, whose -issos ending is Pre-Greek, Melissa was a nymph who discovered and taught the use of honey and from whom bees were believed to have received their name. She was one of the nymph nurses of Zeus, sister to Amaltheia, but rather than feeding the baby milk, Melissa, appropriately for her name, fed him honey. Or, alternatively, the bees brought honey straight to his mouth. Because of her, Melissa became the name of all the nymphs who cared for the patriarch god as a baby. Melissa can also be spelled Mellissa, Mellisa, Melisa, Malissa, Malisa, Mallissa, Mallisa, Milisa, and Milissa.

== Mythology ==
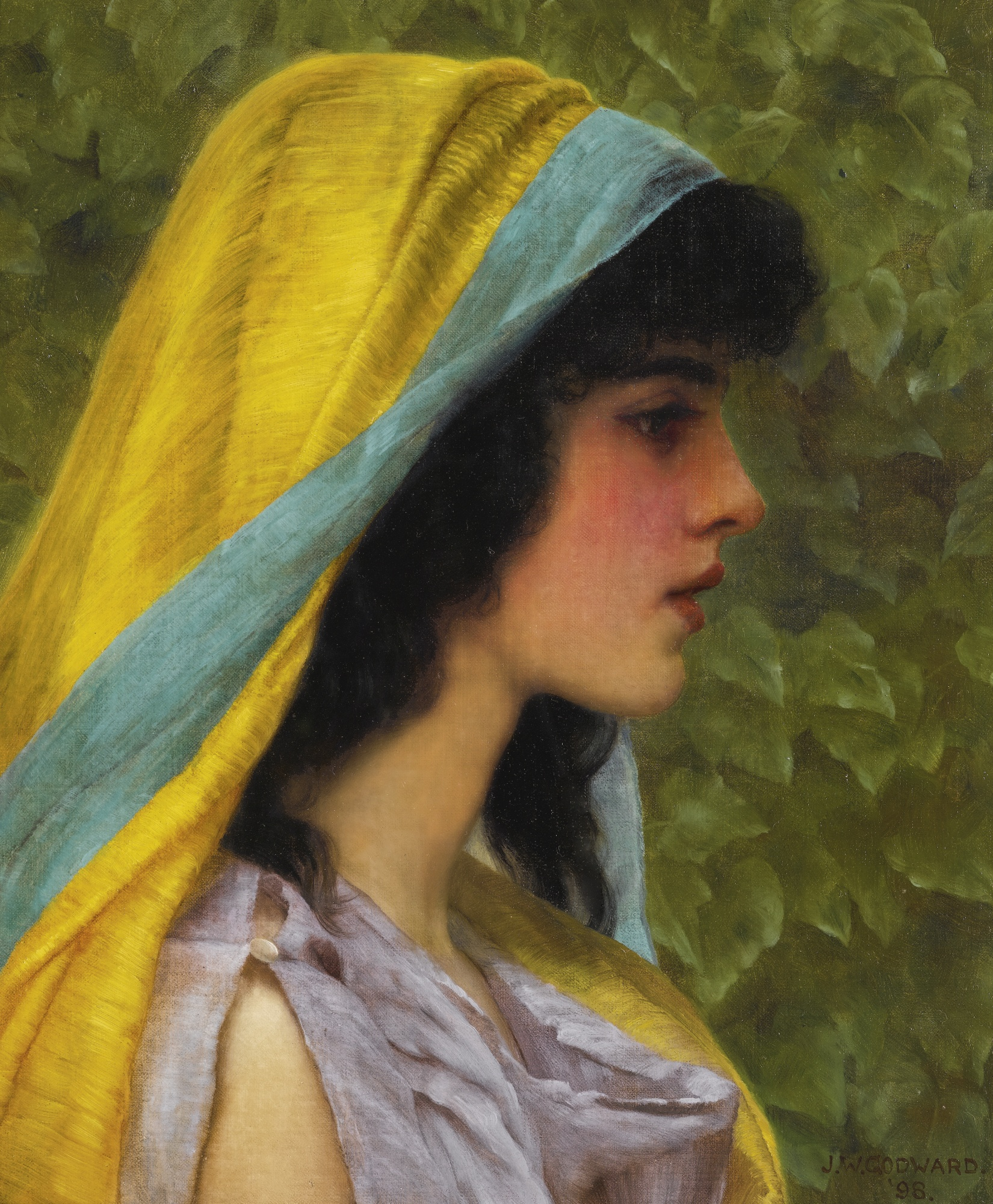
John William Godward, Melissa, 1898

=== Ancient Greek mythology ===
The name "Melissa" has a long history with roots reaching back to even before Ancient Greece. For this reason, in part, there are several versions of the story surrounding the mythological character Melissa, especially in how she came to care for the infant Zeus. Melissa is said to be one of the various nymphs who raised the infant Zeus; in one little-attested version, Zeus transformed her into a bee under unclear circumstances.

Nymphs, such as Melissa, played an important role in mythic accounts of the origin of basic institutions and skills, as in the training of the culture heroes Dionysos and Aristaeus or the civilizing behaviors taught by the bee nymph. The antiquarian Mnaseas' account of Melissa gives a good picture of her function as in this respect. According to folklore, as Larson phrases it, "Melissa first found a honeycomb, tasted it, then mixed it with water as a beverage. She taught others to do this, and thus the creature was named for her, and she was made its guardian." This was part of the Nymphs' achievement of bringing men out of their wild state. Under the guidance of Melissa, the Nymphs not only turned men away from eating each other to eating only this product of the forest trees, but also introduced into the world of men the feeling of modesty.

In addition, the ancient Greek philosopher Porphyry (233 to c. 304 AD) wrote of the priestesses of Demeter, known as Melissae ("bees"), who were initiates of the chthonian goddess. The story surrounding Melissae tells of an elderly priestess of Demeter, named Melissa, initiated into her mysteries by the goddess herself. When Melissa's neighbors tried to make her reveal the secrets of her initiation, she remained silent, never letting a word pass from her lips. In anger, the women tore her to pieces, but Demeter sent a plague upon them, causing bees to be born from Melissa's dead body. From Porphyry's writings, scholars have also learned that Melissa was the name of the moon goddess Artemis and the goddess who took suffering away from mothers giving birth. Souls were symbolized by bees and it was Melissa who drew souls down to be born. She was connected with the idea of a periodic regeneration.

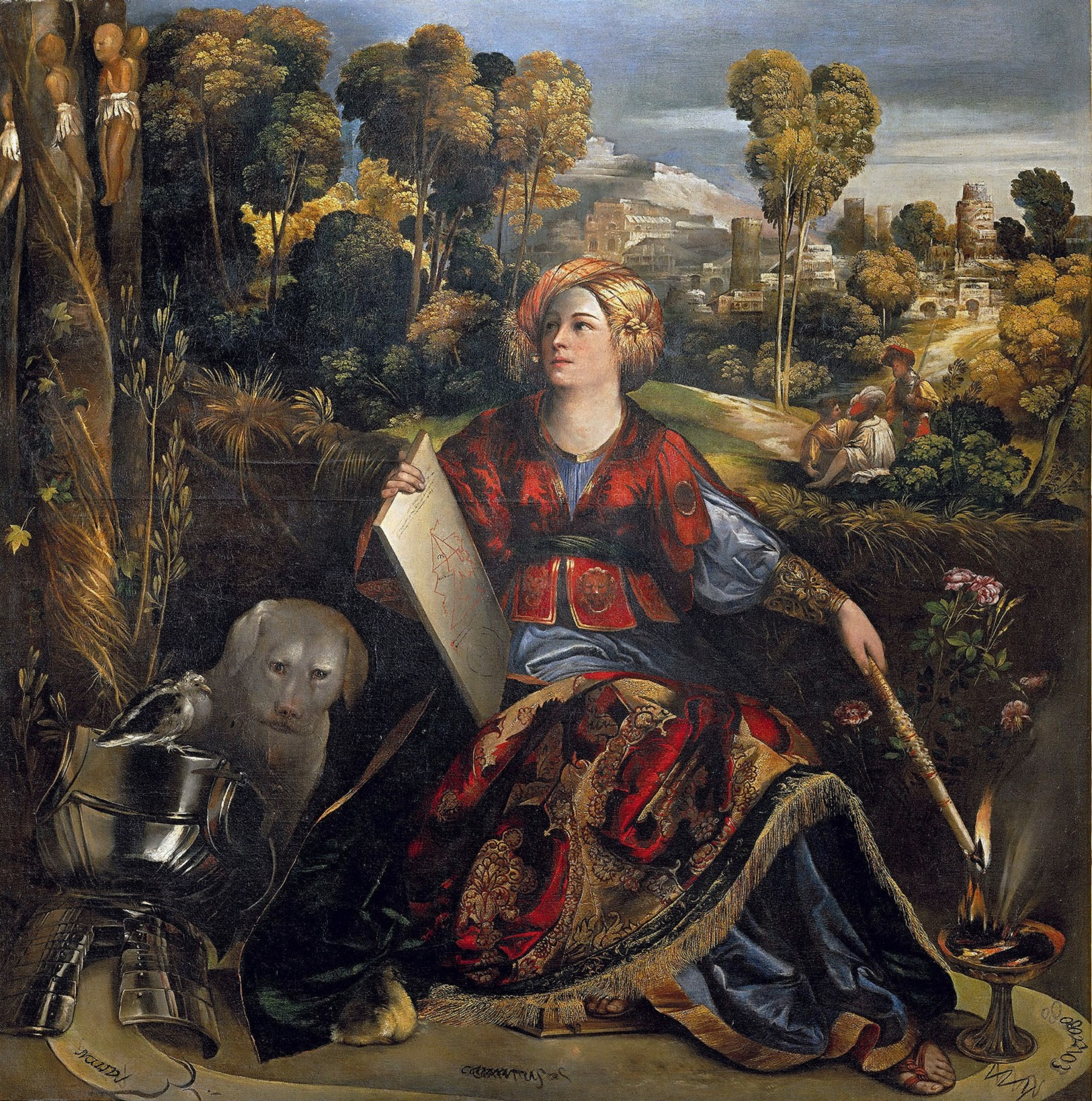
The Melissa of Orlando Furioso, Dosso Dossi, c. 1507

==== Melitta ====
The variant spelling/pronunciation Melitta is the Attic Greek dialect for Melissa. (Compare the Attic word for sea, thalatta, with the more common thalassa.) Within a fragment of the Orphic poetry, quoted by Natalis Comes, Melitta is spoken of as a hive, and called Seira, or the hive of Venus:

Let us celebrate the hive of Venus, who rose from the sea: that hive of many names: the mighty fountain, from whence all kings are descended; from whence all the winged and immortal Loves were again produced.

From the works of Hesychius, it is clear that the word Seira among other interpretations signified Melitta, a bee; also a hive, or house of Melitta, "[s]uch is the sense of it in this passage: and [she] was thus represented in ancient mythology, as being the receptacle, from whence issued that swarm, by which the world was peopled". With that said, Seira was none other than the goddess Demeter, the supposed mother of mankind; who was also styled as Melitta and Melissa, and was looked upon as the Venus of the East. This Deity, Melitta, was the same as Mylitta, the well-known Venus of the Babylonians and Arabians. Melissa or Melitta is also said to be the mother-wife of Phoroneus, the first that reigned, in whose days the dispersion of mankind occurred, whereas before all had been in harmony and only one language was spoken. Melitta, being the feminine of Melitz, the Mediator, consequently signifies Melitta the Mediatrix for sinful mortals.

== Poetry ==
The 16th-century Italian poet Ludovico Ariosto used the name "Melissa" for a good fairy (the good sorceress and prophetess who lived in Merlin's cave) in his poem Orlando Furioso. The following is an ode to Melissa's birthday by Thomas Blacklock, a Scottish poet from the late 18th century.

=== Ode, on Melissa's Birth Day ===
Ye nymphs and swains, whom love inspires
With all his pure and faithful fires,
Hither with joyful steps repair;
You who his tenderest transports share
For lo ! in beauty's fairest pride,
Summer expands her heart so wide;
The Sun no more in clouds inshrin'd,
Darts all his glories unconfin'd;
The feather'd choir from every spray
Salute Melissa's natal day.

Hither ye nymphs and shepherds haste,
Each with a flow'ry chaplet grac'd,
With transport while the shades resound,
And Nature spreads her charms around;
While ev'ry breeze exhales perfumes,
And Bion his mute pipe resumes;
With Bion long disus'd to play,
Salute Melissa's natal day.

For Bion long deplor'd his pain
Thro' woods and devious wilds in vain;
At last impell'd by deep despair,
The swain proferr'd his ardent pray'r;
His ardent pray'r Melissa heard,
And every latent sorrow cheer'd,
His days with social rapture blest,
And sooth'd each anxious care to rest.
Tune, shepherds, tune the festive lay,
And hail Melissa's natal day.

With Nature's incense to the skies
Let all your fervid wishes rise,
That Heav'n and Earth may join to shed
Their choicest blessings on her head;
That years protracted, as they flow,
May pleasures more sublime bestow;
While by succeeding years surpast,
The happiest still may be the last;
And thus each circling Sun display,
A more auspicious natal day.

== Popularity ==
Melissa became a popular name in the United States during the 1950s. The name was very popular from the 1960s to the 1990s; today Melissa is a relatively uncommon baby name. In 2010, fewer than 2,500 girls were given the name, compared with around 10,000 in 1993 and well over 30,000 at the name's peak popularity in 1979. In 2007, Melissa was the 137th most popular name for girls born in the United States, dropping steadily from its peak of second place in 1977. It was among the top ten most popular names for girls from 1967 to 1984.

== In popular culture ==
- "Melissa", a song by The Allman Brothers Band from the album Eat a Peach.
- Melissa, the first studio album by Mercyful Fate, issued in 1983.
- Melissa & Joey is an American sitcom television series.

== People ==
- Melissa, nickname of Lyside, wife of Periander (7th century BC)
- Melissa (3rd century BC), a Pythagorean philosopher
- Melissa E. Sanchez, scholar of English literature

=== In film, television, and radio ===
- Melissa Altro, Canadian voice actress
- Melissa Sue Anderson, American actress
- Melissa Benoist, American actress, singer, dancer, and activist
- Melissa Bracewell, birth name of Melanie Bracewell; New Zealand comedienne, actress, and scriptwriter
- Melissa De Sousa, American actress
- Melissa Fumero, American actress
- Melissa George, Australian actress and entrepreneur
- Melissa Gilbert, American actress and television director
- Melissa Joan Hart, American actress
- Melissa Leo, American actress
- Melissa McBride, American actress
- Melissa McCarthy, American actress, comedian, writer, producer, and fashion designer
- Melissa Rauch, an American actressz
- Melissa Ricks, Filipino actress
- Melissa Stribling, Scottish actress
- Melissa Villaseñor, American actress, comedian, and singer

=== In the arts ===
- Melissa Auf der Maur, Canadian musician, singer-songwriter, photographer, and actress
- Melissa Etheridge, American singer-songwriter, guitarist, and activist
- Melissa Hamilton, Northern Irish ballet dancer
- Melissa Hough, American ballet dancer
- Melissa Jefferson (stage name Lizzo), American singer-songwriter
- Melissa Manchester, American singer-songwriter and actress
- Melissa VanFleet, American singer-songwriter and musician

=== In the sciences ===
- Melissa Farley (born 1942), American clinical psychologist, researcher, and radical feminist activist
- Melissa Hathaway (born 1968), American cybersecurity expert
- Melissa Simon, American clinical obstetrician/gynecologist
- Melissa Trainer, American astrobiologist

=== In sport ===
- Melissa Caddle (born 1992), Guyanese sprinter
- Melissa Cervantes (born 1986), Mexican-American professional wrestler and mixed martial artist
- Mellissa Channell (born 1994), Canadian ice hockey player
- Melissa Diete (born 2012), German rhythmic gymnast
- Melissa Gallegos (born 1978/79), American football player
- Mélissa Godart, French association football player
- Melissa Jefferson-Wooden (born 2001), American sprinter
- Melissa Maizels (born 1993), Australian footballer
- Melissa Mantak, triathlete and triathlon coach from the United States
- Melissa Márquez (born 1996), Mexican rower
- Melissa Tanner (born 1973), Australian Paralympic archer
- Melissa Vargas (born 1999), Turkish volleyball player
- Melissa Wu (born 1992), Australian diver

=== In politics ===
- Melissa Douglas, American politician
- Melissa Lee (born 1966), New Zealand politician
- Melissa Schmidt, American politician
- Melissa Stuckey, American politician

=== Criminals ===
- Melissa Ann Shepard (born 1935), Canadian murderer

== Other uses ==
- Melissa (computer virus)
- List of storms named Melissa
  - Hurricane Melissa (2025)
