= Karagounides =

Ethnic Greek subgroup

Karagounides (Greek: Καραγκούνηδες; singular: Καραγκούνης, Karagounis) are an ethnic Greek subgroup, native to the western plains of Thessaly, Greece. More specifically, they are the inhabitants of the lowland farming communities of the Karditsa and Trikala regions, and the area around the city of Farsala.

Alexandros Filadelfeus and Nikolaos Georgiadis stated that the word Karagounides comes from the black dipthera or black fur. According to Antonis Rizo, the origin of the name is purely Turkish. George Exarchos mentions two additional etymologies from the Turkish words kara (black) and Yunan (Greek), which evolved into Karagounis, and from the Vlach word Gerkounioi (Greeks), which evolved into Garkounis and later into Karagounis.

The Karagounides of Thessaly are not related to the homonymous Vlach-speaking population group of the Karagounides or Arvanitovlachs of Akarnania, who use the endonym Rmeni or Remeni, identified with the names Armouni, Aromanoi or Armanoi.

In earlier years, the Karagounides lived in the plains of Karditsa, Farsala and Trikala and were Koligoi.
