= Juvanje =

- Location in Slovenia
- Coordinates: 46°20′17.24″N 14°51′20.94″E
- Country: Slovenia
- Traditional region: Styria
- Statistical region: Savinja
- Municipality: Ljubno

Area
  - Total: 1.2 km^{2} (0.46 sq mi)
- Elevation: 410.5 m (1,347 ft)

Population (2019)
  - Total: 136

Juvanje (pronounced [juˈʋaːnjɛ]) is a small settlement on the left bank of the Savinja River in the Municipality of Ljubno in Slovenia. The area belongs to the traditional region of Styria and is now included in the Savinja Statistical Region.
