= Savina, Ljubno =

Savina
- Location in Slovenia
- Coordinates: 46°21′6.26″N 14°48′48.79″E
- Country: Slovenia
- Traditional region: Styria
- Statistical region: Savinja
- Municipality: Ljubno

Area
  - Total: 11.26 km^{2} (4.35 sq mi)
- Elevation: 447.4 m (1,468 ft)

Population (2019)
  - Total: 204

Savina (pronounced [saˈʋiːna]) is a dispersed settlement in the hills west of Ljubno ob Savinji in Slovenia. The area belongs to the traditional region of Styria and is now included in the Savinja Statistical Region.
