= Primož pri Ljubnem =

Primož pri Ljubnem Sveti Primož (until 1955)
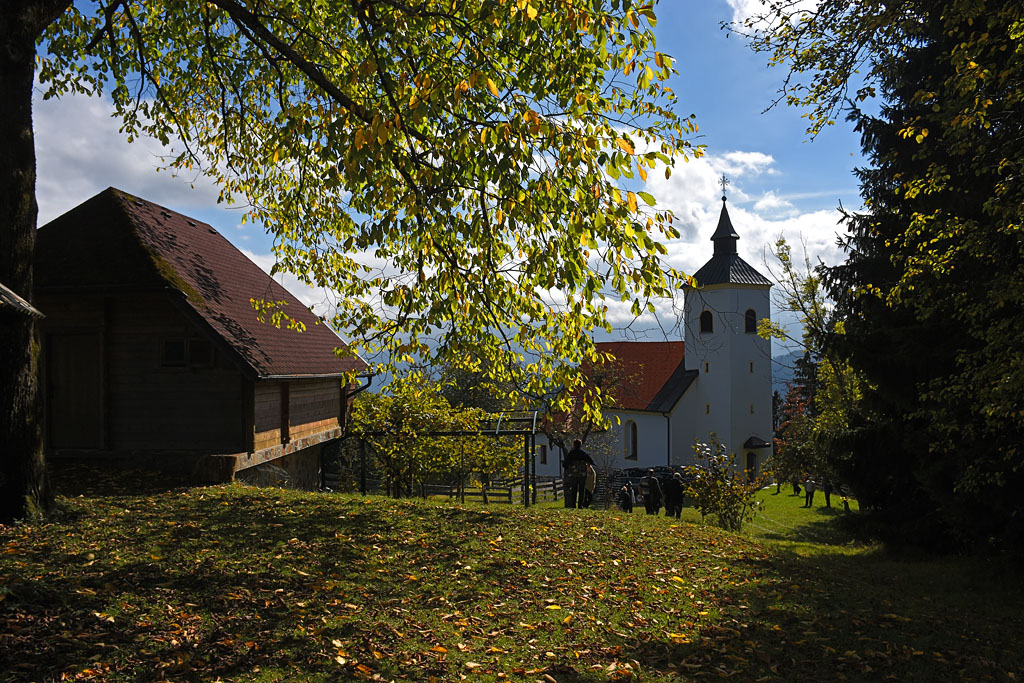

- Location in Slovenia
- Coordinates: 46°22′17.19″N 14°48′49.48″E
- Country: Slovenia
- Traditional region: Styria
- Statistical region: Savinja
- Municipality: Ljubno

Area
  - Total: 16.59 km^{2} (6.41 sq mi)
- Elevation: 663 m (2,175 ft)

Population (2019)
  - Total: 167

Primož pri Ljubnem (pronounced [ˈpɾiːmɔʃ pɾi ˈljuːbnɛm]) is a dispersed settlement in the hills north of Ljubno ob Savinji in Slovenia. The area belongs to the traditional region of Styria and is now included in the Savinja Statistical Region.

== Name ==
The name of the settlement was changed from Sveti Primož (literally, 'Saint Primus') to Primož pri Ljubnem (literally, 'Primus near Ljubno') in 1955. The name was changed on the basis of the 1948 Law on Names of Settlements and Designations of Squares, Streets, and Buildings as part of efforts by Slovenia's postwar communist government to remove religious elements from toponyms.

== Church ==
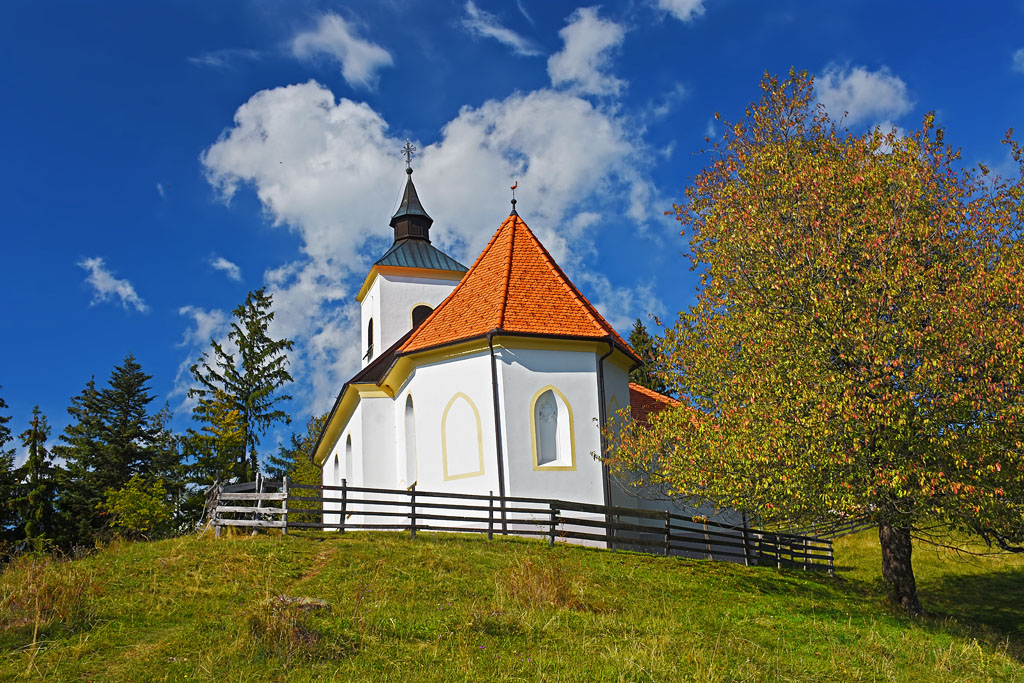
Saints Primus and Felician Church

The local church, from which the settlement gets its name, is dedicated to Saints Primus and Felician and belongs to the Parish of Ljubno ob Savinji. It has a rectangular nave with a western belfry. It was built in 1481 and extensively renovated in the late 18th century and again in 1874.
