= Melissa E. Sanchez =

Scholar of English literature

Academic background
- Education: University of California, Irvine (BA, 1995; MA, 1998; PhD, 2002)

Academic work
- Discipline: English literature
- Institutions: San Francisco State University (2004–2006); University of Pennsylvania (2006-)

Melissa E. Sanchez is a scholar of English literature. She is the author of Erotic Subjects (2011), Queer Faith (2019), and Shakespeare and Queer Theory (2019). She is also co-editor of Rethinking Feminism in Early Modern Studies (2016), with Ania Loomba, and editor of The Routledge Companion to Queer Literary Studies (2025). As of 2026, Sanchez is the Donald T. Regan Professor of English and Comparative Literature at the University of Pennsylvania.

== Education ==
Sanchez studied English at the University of California, Irvine, from which she received a Bachelor of Arts (1995), Master of Arts (1998), and Doctor of Philosophy (2002), as well as a graduate certificate in feminist theory (2002).

== Career ==
Sanchez began her career as an assistant professor in the English department at San Francisco State University from 2004 to 2006, after which she joined the University of Pennsylvania's English and gender studies departments. From 2021 to 2024, she was the director of the university's Gender, Sexuality, and Women's Studies department, as well as the university's Center for Research in Feminist, Queer, and Transgender Studies. Since 2019, she has held the position of Donald T. Regan Professor of English and Comparative Literature.

Sanchez is the author of two books, editor of one collection, and co-editor of one published collection with another scheduled for publication in December 2026. Sanchez's first book, Erotic Subjects: The Sexuality of Politics in Early Modern English Literature, was published by Oxford University Press in 2011. The book examines erotic literature from the sixteenth and seventeenth centuries from the perspective of English politics. Rethinking Feminism in Early Modern Studies, which Sanchez co-edited with Ania Loomba, was published by Routledge in 2016. The book consists of four parts: "Histories", "Methods", "Bodies", and "Agency". Sanchez's second authored book, Queer Faith: Reading Promiscuity and Race in the Secular Love Tradition, was published by New York University Press in 2019. Sanchez's third authored book, Shakespeare and Queer Theory, was published by Bloomsbury in 2019. The Routledge Companion to Queer Literary Studies, which Sanchez edited, was published by Routledge in 2025. The book consists of eleven parts: "Affect and Sensation", "Genealogies of Queer Studies", "The LIterariness of Queer Studies", "Race, Materiality, Environmental Studies", "The Politics of Queer Reading", "Promiscuous Selfhoods", "Queer Maternities", "Queer Pasts", "Relationality", "Trans Stucdies, Queer Studies, and Racialized Gender", and "The Value of Critique". "All the World in Thee": An Anthology of LGBTQ+ Poetry from Homer to Hughes, which Sanchez co-edited with Stephanie Burt and Drew Daniel, is scheduled for publication by Columbia University Press in December 2026.

== Publications ==
- Sanchez, Melissa E. (2011). Erotic Subjects: The Sexuality of Politics in Early Modern English Literature. Oxford University Press. ISBN 978-0-199-89691-2.
- Loomba, Ania; Sanchez, Melissa E., eds. (2016). Rethinking Feminism in Early Modern Studies: Gender, Race, and Sexuality. Routledge. ISBN 978-1-472-42176-0.
- Sanchez, Melissa E. (2019). Queer Faith: Reading Promiscuity and Race in the Secular Love Tradition. New York University Press. ISBN 978-1-479-87187-2.
- Sanchez, Melissa E. (2019). Shakespeare and Queer Theory. Bloomsbury Publishing. ISBN 978-1-474-25667-4.
- Sanchez, Melissa E., ed. (2025). The Routledge Companion to Queer Literary Studies. Routledge. ISBN 978-1-032-78251-5.
- Burt, Stephanie; Daniel, Drew; Sanchez, Melissa E., eds. (2026). All the World in Thee: An Anthology of LGBTQ+ Poetry from Homer to Hughes. Columbia University Press. ISBN 978-0-231-22253-2.
