= Radmirje =

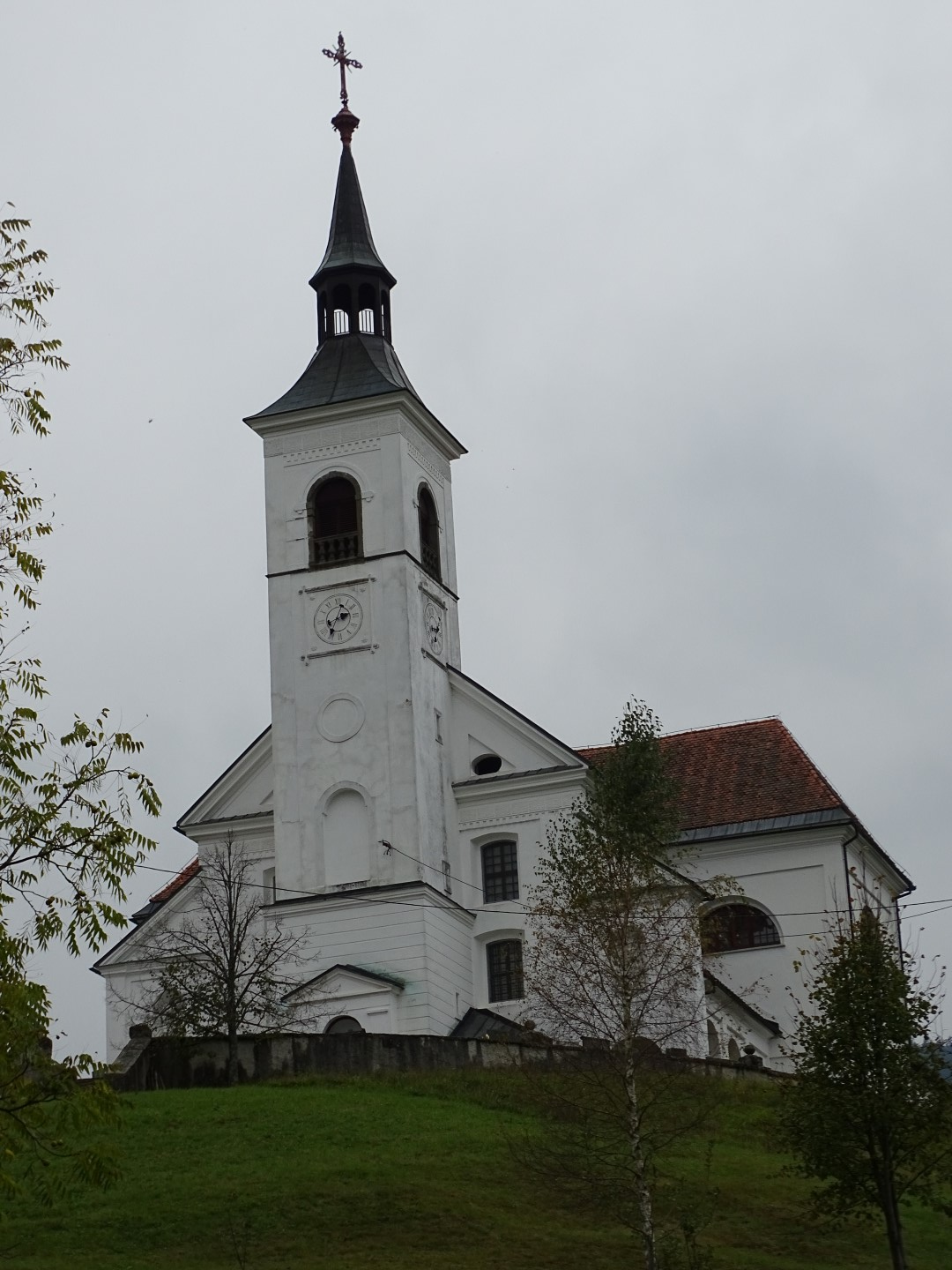
- Parish church at Radmirje

- Location in Slovenia
- Coordinates: 46°19′36.07″N 14°50′52.99″E
- Country: Slovenia
- Traditional region: Styria
- Statistical region: Savinja
- Municipality: Ljubno

Area
  - Total: 4.81 km^{2} (1.86 sq mi)
- Elevation: 434.7 m (1,426 ft)

Population (2019)
  - Total: 458

Radmirje (pronounced [ɾadˈmiːɾjɛ], German: Frattmannsdorf) is a village south of Ljubno ob Savinji in Slovenia. The area belongs to the traditional region of Styria and is now included in the Savinja Statistical Region.

The local parish church is dedicated to Saint Francis Xavier and belongs to the Roman Catholic Diocese of Celje. It was built between 1721 and 1725 to replace a 15th-century church dedicated to Saint Barbara. A second smaller church is built on a hill in the centre of the settlement and is dedicated to Saint Michael. It was first mentioned in written documents dating to 1395, but has been extensively rebuilt over the centuries.
