= Mélissa Godart =

French association football player (born 1991)

Personal information
- Date of birth: 6 February 1991 (age 35)
- Place of birth: Metz, France
- Height: 1.65 m (5 ft 5 in)
- Position: Defender

International career
Years	Team	Apps	(Gls)
2010	France U19	7	(0)

Mélissa Godart (born 6 February 1991) is a French footballer who plays as a defender for OGC Nice.

== Biography ==
=== Club career ===
Mélissa Godart was born in Metz and first trained in football in her native department, Moselle, passing through Amanvillers, ES Saint-Privat-Roncourt then Woippy.

She played for a senior season at AS Algrange in Division 2 from 2008 to 2009, then joined ESOFV La Roche-sur-Yon and discovered D1. In 2014, she joined ASJ Soyaux. After two years in Charente, she returned to AS Algrange, which has since become FC Metz.

In 2020, after four seasons with FC Metz, three in D1 and one in D2, she announced her departure from the club and her desire to play abroad.

=== Career in selection ===
Mélissa Godart has seven selections for the French U19 team, including two matches in the 2010 European Championship, which she won with the French team. She is also part of the French military team, world champion in 2016, in Vannes, Brittany.

== Honours ==
- 2010 UEFA Women's Under-19 Championship
