= Meliše =

- Location in Slovenia
- Coordinates: 46°19′3.76″N 14°51′52.92″E
- Country: Slovenia
- Traditional region: Styria
- Statistical region: Savinja
- Municipality: Ljubno

Area
  - Total: 1.42 km^{2} (0.55 sq mi)
- Elevation: 409.8 m (1,344 ft)

Population (2002)
  - Total: 51

Meliše (pronounced [mɛˈliːʃɛ], German: Melische) is a small settlement on the right bank of the Savinja River in the Municipality of Ljubno in Slovenia. The area belongs to the traditional region of Styria and is now included in the Savinja Statistical Region.
