= University of Thessaly =

Public university in Thessaly, Greece

Coordinates: 39.3577°N 22.9484°E

University Of Thessaly
- Πανεπιστήμιο Θεσσαλίας
- Type: Public higher education institution
- Established: 1984; 42 years ago
- Affiliations: European University Association (EUA)
- Chancellor: Charalampos Billinis
- Vice-Chancellor: Ioannis Stefanidis; Chrysi Laspidou; Ioannis Anagnostopoulos; Panagiotis Plageras
- Undergraduates: 14,000 (2014)
- Postgraduates: 3,550 (2014)
- Location: Volos main campus Karditsa; Larissa; Trikala; Lamia
- Colors
- Mascot: Centaurus
- Website: www.uth.gr/en

The University of Thessaly (UTh; Greek: Πανεπιστήμιο Θεσσαλίας, ΠΘ) is a Greek public university located in Thessaly, founded in 1984. The university includes the main campus in the city of Volos and regional campuses located in Karditsa, Larissa, Trikala, and the city of Lamia. The university's central administrative and academic building, located on the seaport seafront of Volos, it is often referred to as the main campus, but actually the university does not have a single main site, as it has multi sites with buildings being geographically distributed within the wider region of Volos across the city districts. Enrollment for Fall 2024-2025 consisted of 45,660 undergraduates students, 4,920 master's degree-level students, 1,736 doctoral students, and 1,107 permanent teaching and research staff.

== Emblem ==
The emblem of the University of Thessaly is Chiron, who used to live in Pelion Mountain and was famous for his special knowledge about medicine, music, archery, hunting, gymnastics and the art of prophecy.

== History ==
Most university departments were founded by the end of 2001. In 2013, the University of Central Greece (UCG) main campus (2003–2013) in the City of Lamia and its Department of Computer Science and Biomedical Informatics, merged with University of Thessaly. This was followed in 2019 by the Technological Educational Institute of Central Greece (TEICG) main campus (2013–2019) in the City of Lamia and its Departments of Nursing, Physiotherapy, Computer Science, Electronic Engineering, they also are merging with University of Thessaly. Since then these are the existing two sites of the University of Thessaly in the City of Lamia.

In January 2019, the University of Thessaly absorbed all the departments of the then existing technological entity, TEI of Thessaly located in the cities of Larissa and Karditsa.

== Academics ==
The language of instruction is Greek, although there are programs in foreign languages and courses for international students, which are carried out in English, French, German and Italian. The university includes eight Faculties (shown in the table below), further divided into departments. Each department includes undergraduate and postgraduate degree programmes.

Faculties	Departments
School of Agricultural Sciences (est. in 2013, Volos)	Animal Science (est. in 2019, Larissa); Food Science and Nutrition (est. in 2019, Karditsa); Agriculture-Agrotechnology (est. in 2019, Larissa); Ichthyology and Aquatic Environment (est. in 2002, Volos); Agriculture Crop Production and Rural Environment (est. in 2002, Volos)
School of Economics and Business Administration (est. in 2019, Larissa)	Economics (est. in 1999, Volos); Accounting and Finance (est. in 2019, Larissa)
School of Engineering (est. in 2013, Volos)	Electrical and Computer Engineering (est. in 2000, Volos); Civil Engineering (est. in 1994, Volos); Mechanical Engineering (est. in 1990, Volos); Planning and Regional Development (est. in 1989, Volos); Architecture (est. in 1999, Volos)
School of Technology (est. in 2019, Larissa)	Environmental Sciences (est. in 2019, Larissa); Digital Systems (est. in 2019, Larissa); Energy Systems (est. in 2019, Larissa); Forestry, Wood Sciences, and Design (est. in 2019, Karditsa)
School of Humanities and Social Sciences (est. in 1993, Volos)	Special Education (est. in 1998, Volos); Primary Education (est. in 1988, Volos); Language and Intercultural Studies (est. in 2019, Volos); Culture, Creative Media, and Industries (est. in 2019, Volos); History, Archaeology, and Social Anthropology (est. in 1998, Volos)
School of Physical Education, Sport Science and Dietetics (est. in 2013, Trikala)	Nutrition and Dietetics (est. in 2019, Trikala); Physical Education and Sport Science (est. in 1994, Trikala)
School of Health Sciences (est. in 1993, Larissa)	Biochemistry and Biotechnology (est. in 2000, Larissa); Public and One Health (est. in 2019, Karditsa); Veterinary Medicine (est. in 1994, Karditsa); Medicine (est. in 1990, Larissa); Nursing (est. in 2019, Larissa); Physiotherapy (est. in 2019, City of Lamia)
School of Sciences (est. in 2013, City of Lamia)	Physics (est. in 2019, City of Lamia); Mathematics (est. in 2019, City of Lamia); Informatics and Telecommunications (est. in 2013, City of Lamia)

== University units ==
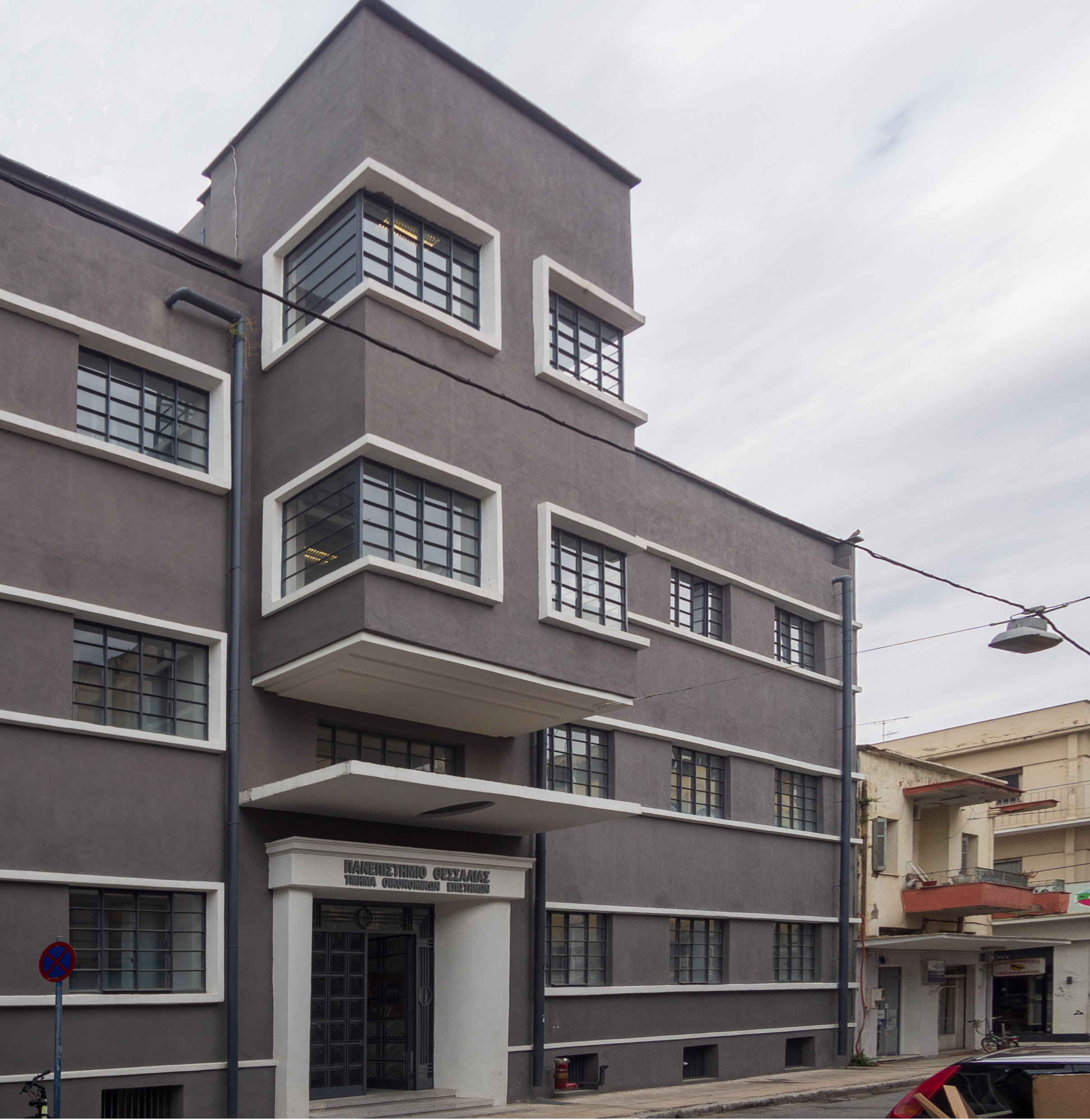
The Department of Economics is housed in the old industry building of Matsagos

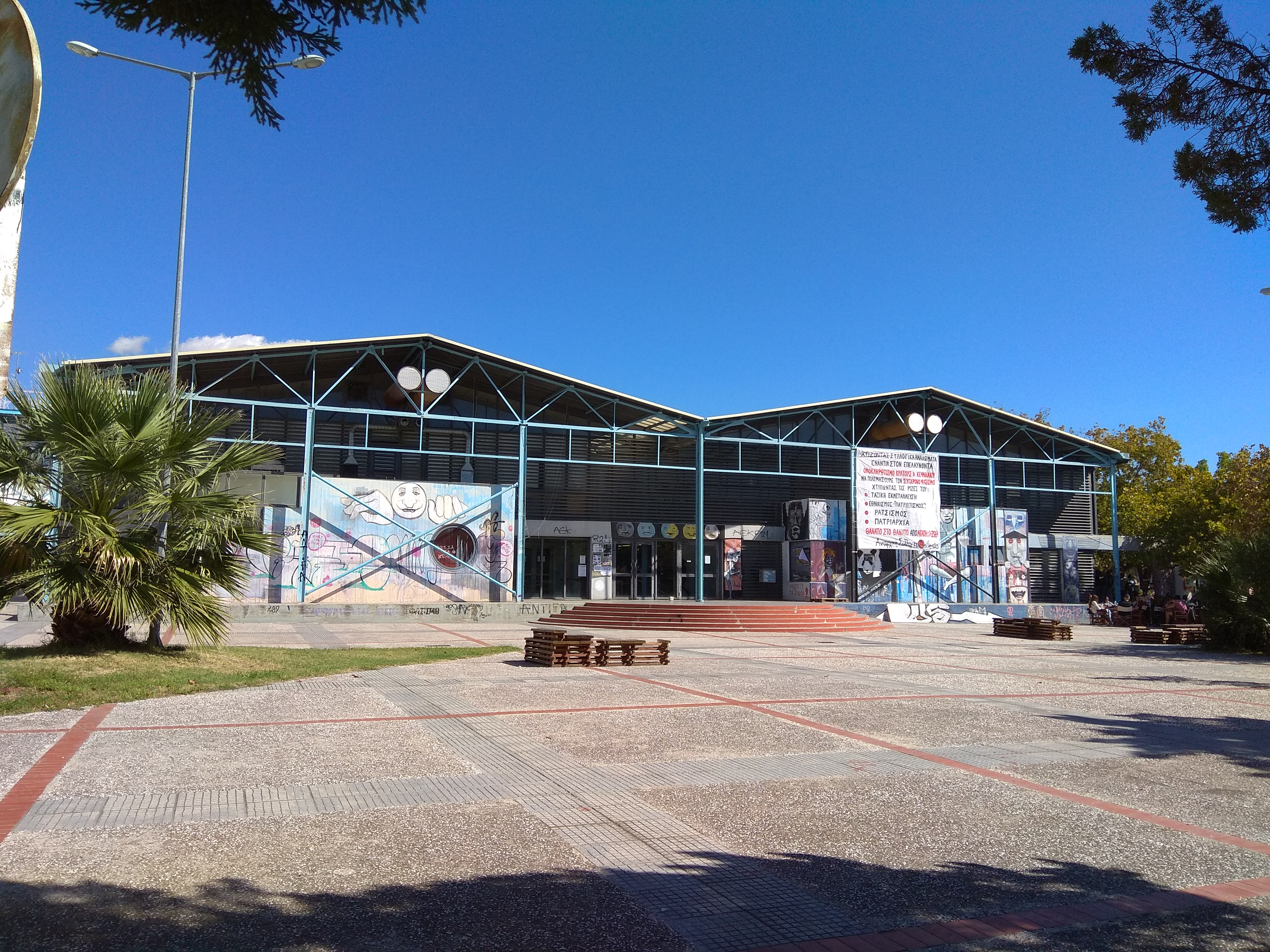
The Department of Architecture in the campus of Engineering school in Volos

=== Library and Information Center ===
Library and Information Center of University of Thessaly was founded in 1995. Its central building is hosted in the renewed building of the old Athens Bank, which was built in 1903, and is located in the center of Volos. Moreover, there are branches of the Library that operate in every faculty in all cities of University of Thessaly. The Kitsos Makris Folklore Center is also part of the University of Thessaly Library & Information Center.

=== Residence Hall ===
University of Thessaly owns a small Student Residence Hall in Volos with a capacity of 40 rooms. There is also an accommodation grant of 100 € per month for the undergraduate foreign students of countries outside EU. For the Greek students and also the students of countries members of EU there is an accommodation grant of 1000 € per year depending on academic and financial criteria. There are plans for the development of a new large scale residence hall in the near future.

=== Psychological Counseling and Support for Students ===
The Laboratory of Psychology and Educational Applications of the Department of Special Education offers psychological support and help to all students who need it, in order to deal with their personal difficulties and concerns, and it also helps in developing skills on how to manage potential problems, such as problems in student life, difficulties in personal relations and other psychological disorders.

=== KEDIVIM ===
The Centre of Continuing Education and Lifelong Learning (KEDIVIM; Greek: Κ.Ε.ΔΙ.ΒΙ.Μ. - Κέντρο Επιμόρφωσης και Δια Βίου Μάθησης) of University of Thessaly is a separate continuing and professional adult educational unit within University of Thessaly, at "non-typical education" (φορέας μη τυπικής εκπαίδευσης), although it is fully or partially regulated by the state and lead to officially recognised qualifications being considered non-formal education (NFE). It offers short-term courses on-campus and by Distance e-Learning Mode off-campus mediated via in real time computer-mediated communication, certified by the EOPPEP - National Organization for the Certification of Qualifications and Vocational Guidance (Greek: Εθνικός Οργανισμός Πιστοποίησης Προσόντων και Επαγγελματικού Προσανατολισμού - Ε.Ο.Π.Π.Ε.Π.). In Greece, adult education, continuing education or lifelong learning is offered to students of all adult ages.

== Culture and sports ==
University of Thessaly offers the possibility of many sports and cultural activities. There are many student groups consisting the team of Physical Education, Musical Ensembles, Theater Group, Photography Group etc. Moreover, there is plenty of student groups that undertake cultural actions such as Cinema Group and University of Thessaly Student Radio.

== Academic evaluation ==
University rankings

Global – Overall
- ARWU World: 801–900 (2023)
- USNWR Global: =964 (2023)

In 2015, the external evaluation committee gave University of Thessaly a Positive evaluation. An external evaluation of all academic departments in Greek universities was conducted by the Hellenic Quality Assurance and Accreditation Agency (HQA) in the previous years.

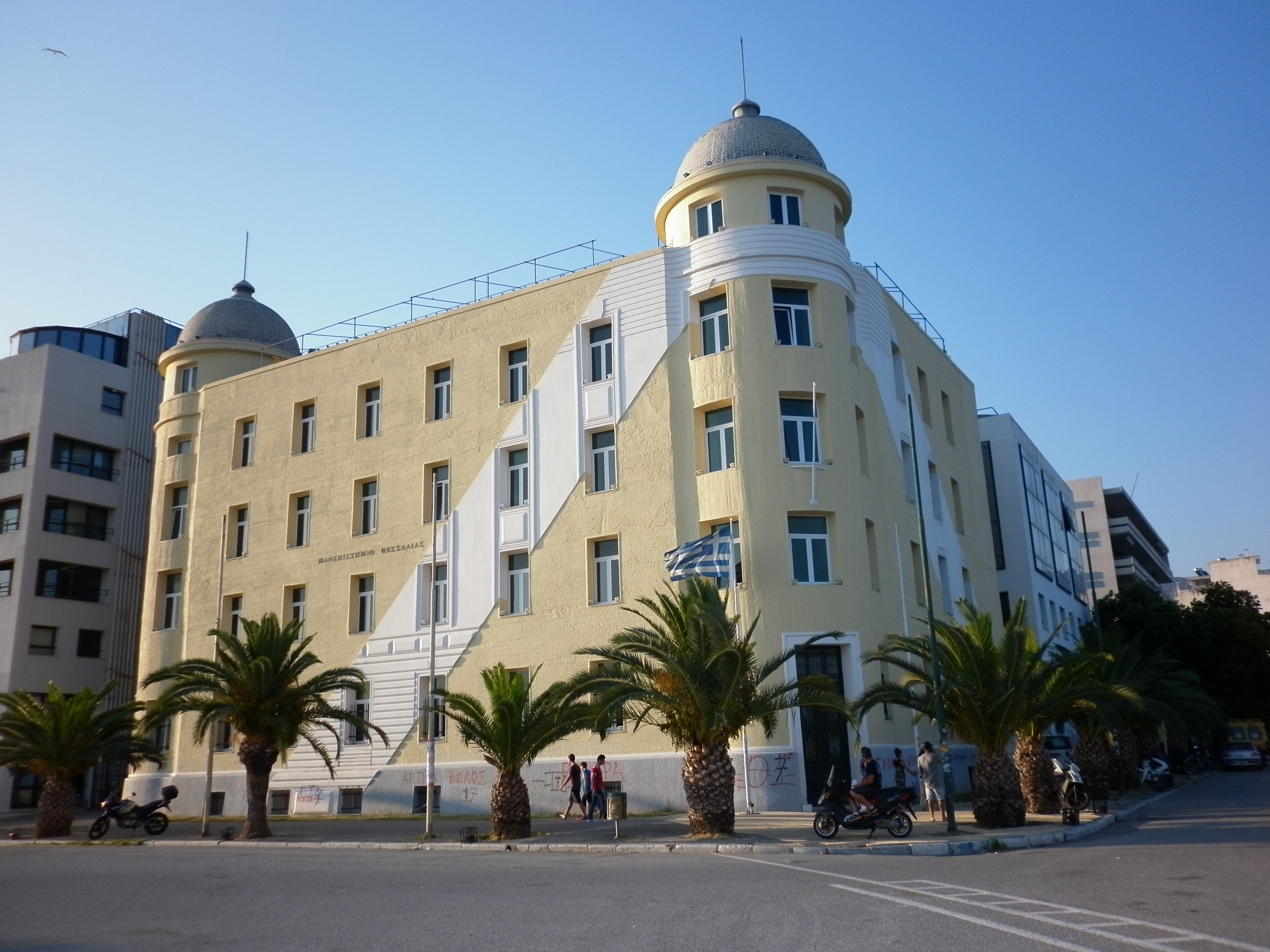
The administration building of University of Thessaly in Volos

== Alumni ==
Alexis Batrakoulis (Greek: Αλέξης Μπατρακούλης), MS, CSCS, CSPS, NSCA-CPT, RCPT*E. Founder and Education Director of International Obesity Exercise Training Institute, National Strength and Conditioning Association (NSCA) ERP Sponsor of University of Thessaly, NSCA PTQ Journal Review Panel Member, NSCA PT SIG Executive Council Member, NSCA Membership Commitment Member, 2018 IDEA Personal Trainer of the Year, 2019 IDEA Fitness Innovation Award Recipient, 2020 NSCA Personal Trainer of the Year.

== See also ==
- List of research institutes in Greece
- List of universities in Greece
- Balkan Universities Network
- Open access in Greece
