= Melissa Moore =

Melissa Moore may refer to:

- Melissa Moore (actress) (born 1963), American B-movie actress
- Melissa Moore (athlete) (born 1968), Australian Olympic sprinter
- Melissa Moore (soccer) (born 1975), American soccer player
- Melissa J. Moore, American biochemist
- Melissa Moore, American musician, former member of Absu and Rumpelstiltskin Grinder
- Melissa G. Moore, daughter of Keith Hunter Jesperson
