= Kampos, Karditsa =

Kampos Κάμπος
- Municipal unit
- Location within the regional unit

- Location within Greece
- Coordinates: 39°23′N 21°59′E
- Country: Greece
- Administrative region: Thessaly
- Regional unit: Karditsa
- Municipality: Karditsa

Area
  - Municipal unit: 90.4 km^{2} (34.9 sq mi)

Population (2021)
  - Municipal unit: 3,615
  - Municipal unit density: 40.0/km^{2} (104/sq mi)
- Time zone: UTC+2 (EET)
  - Summer (DST): UTC+3 (EEST)
- Vehicle registration: ΚΑ

Kampos (Greek: Κάμπος) is a former municipality in the Karditsa regional unit, Thessaly, Greece. Since the 2011 local government reform it is part of the municipality Karditsa, of which it is a municipal unit. The municipal unit has an area of 90.400 km^{2}. Population 3,615 (2021). The seat of the municipality was in Stavros. The name of the municipality comes from the greek word "kampos", campus, meaning plain (after the Thessalian plain).
