= Vassilis Papazachos =

Greek politician and seismologist (1929–2022)

Vassilis Papazachos (Greek: Βασίλης Παπαζάχος; 30 September 1929 – 10 November 2022) was a Greek seismologist and author of Earthquakes of Greece.

Born on 30 September 1929 in the village of Smokovo in Karditsa regional unit, Vassilis Papazachos studied physics in the University of Athens, Greece. He received a M.Sc. in geophysics from Saint Louis University (1963) and a doctorate in Seismology from the University of Athens (1961). He first became involved in geophysics as an assistant of professor Angelos Galanopoulos (1955–1956) and then moved to the Geodynamic Institute of the National Observatory of Athens (1956–1977). Later in his career he became Professor of Seismology in the Aristotle University (1977–1998), where he was still active as an emeritus professor.

Papazachos always attracted publicity in his country Greece, which is highly seismogenic and has been tormented by many earthquakes both in historic and prehistoric times. He was an ardent opposer of Panayotis Varotsos and the VAN method for earthquake prediction, which he called "the greatest science joke of the century".

Vassilis Papazachos was also involved in Greek politics for long time. A supporter of the left, he was asked by the Communist Party of Greece to lead their ticket and run for mayor of Thessaloniki, but he refused, saying that such active involvement would distract him from his scientific work. However, he eventually ran for mayor in his birthplace with the support of the Synaspismos party of the radical left. He was also a candidate state MP in the 2000 Greek legislative election, again for Synaspismos.
