= Itamos =

Itamos Ίταμος
- Municipal unit
- Location within the regional unit

- Location within Greece
- Coordinates: 39°12′N 21°48′E
- Country: Greece
- Administrative region: Thessaly
- Regional unit: Karditsa
- Municipality: Karditsa

Area
  - Municipal unit: 234.4 km^{2} (90.5 sq mi)

Population (2021)
  - Municipal unit: 2,781
  - Municipal unit density: 11.86/km^{2} (30.73/sq mi)
- Time zone: UTC+2 (EET)
  - Summer (DST): UTC+3 (EEST)
- Vehicle registration: ΚΑ

Itamos (Greek: Ίταμος) is a former municipality in the Karditsa regional unit, Thessaly, Greece, named after the ancient city of "Itamos". Since the 2011 local government reform it is part of the municipality Karditsa, of which it is a municipal unit. The municipal unit has an area of 234.384 km^{2}. Population 2,781 (2021). The seat of the municipality was in Kallithiro.
