= Kallifoni =

Kallifoni Καλλιφώνι
- Municipal unit
- Location within the regional unit

- Location within Greece
- Coordinates: 39°12′N 21°57′E
- Country: Greece
- Administrative region: Thessaly
- Regional unit: Karditsa
- Municipality: Karditsa

Area
  - Municipal unit: 154.6 km^{2} (59.7 sq mi)

Population (2021)
  - Municipal unit: 1,991
  - Municipal unit density: 12.88/km^{2} (33.35/sq mi)
  - Community: 830
- Time zone: UTC+2 (EET)
  - Summer (DST): UTC+3 (EEST)
- Vehicle registration: ΚΑ

Kallifoni (Greek: Καλλιφώνι) is a village and a former municipality in the Karditsa regional unit, Thessaly, Greece. Since the 2011 local government reform it is part of the municipality Karditsa, of which it is a municipal unit. The municipal unit has an area of 154.623 km^{2}. Population 1,991 (2021).
