= Melisa Michaels =

American author (1946–2019)

Melisa C. Michaels
- Born: May 31, 1946
- Died: August 30, 2019 (aged 73)
- Occupations: Science fiction and mystery author

Melisa C. Michaels (May 31, 1946 – August 30, 2019) was an American science fiction and mystery author. Her novel Skirmish was nominated for a Locus Award for Best First Novel in 1986. An active member of the Science Fiction and Fantasy Writers of America (SFWA), she served on the Nebula Awards jury three times, in 1996, 1997 and 2002. In 2008, she received a SFWA Service Award.

== Selected works ==
=== Skyrider series ===
- Skirmish (1985) ISBN 0-8125-4566-4 Tor Books
- First Battle (1985) ISBN 0-8125-4568-0 Tom Doherty Assoc
- Last War (1986) ISBN 0812545702 Tor Books
- Pirate Prince (1987) ISBN 0-8125-4572-9 Tor Books
- Floater Factor (1988) ISBN 0-8125-4578-8 Tor Books

=== Rosie Lavine series ===
- Cold Iron (1997) ISBN 0-451-45654-8 Roc
- Sister to the Rain (1998) ISBN 0-451-45730-7 Roc

=== Novels ===
- Through the Eyes of the Dead (1988) ISBN 0-8027-5718-9 Walker & Co
- Far Harbor (1989) ISBN 0-8125-4581-8 Tor Books
- World-Walker (2004) ISBN 1-59414-215-7 Five Star

=== Anthologies containing stories by Melisa Michaels ===
- The Best Science Fiction of the Year 9 (1980) ISBN 0-345-28601-4 Del Rey
- Horrors (1986) ISBN 0-451-45515-0 Roc
- Almanahul Anticipația 1984 (1983) Știință & Tehnică

=== Short stories ===
- ″In the Country of the Blind, No One Can See″ (1979)
- ″A Demon in My View″ (1981)
- ″I Have a Winter Reason″ (1981)
- ″I Am Large, I Contain Multitudes″ (1982)
- ″Renascence″ (1982) with Terry Carr
- ″Intermezzo″ (1983)
- ″Painted Houses″ (1999)

=== Essays ===
- ″Stalking the Wily Label″ (1998)

=== Cover art ===
- The Darkover Concordance: A Reader's Guide (1979)
- Bones of the World (2001)
- The Ballad of Billy Badass and the Rose of Turkestan (2001)

== Sources ==
- Interview
- Interview
- Reviews
