= Melisa Kerman =

Turkish volleyball player (born 1994)

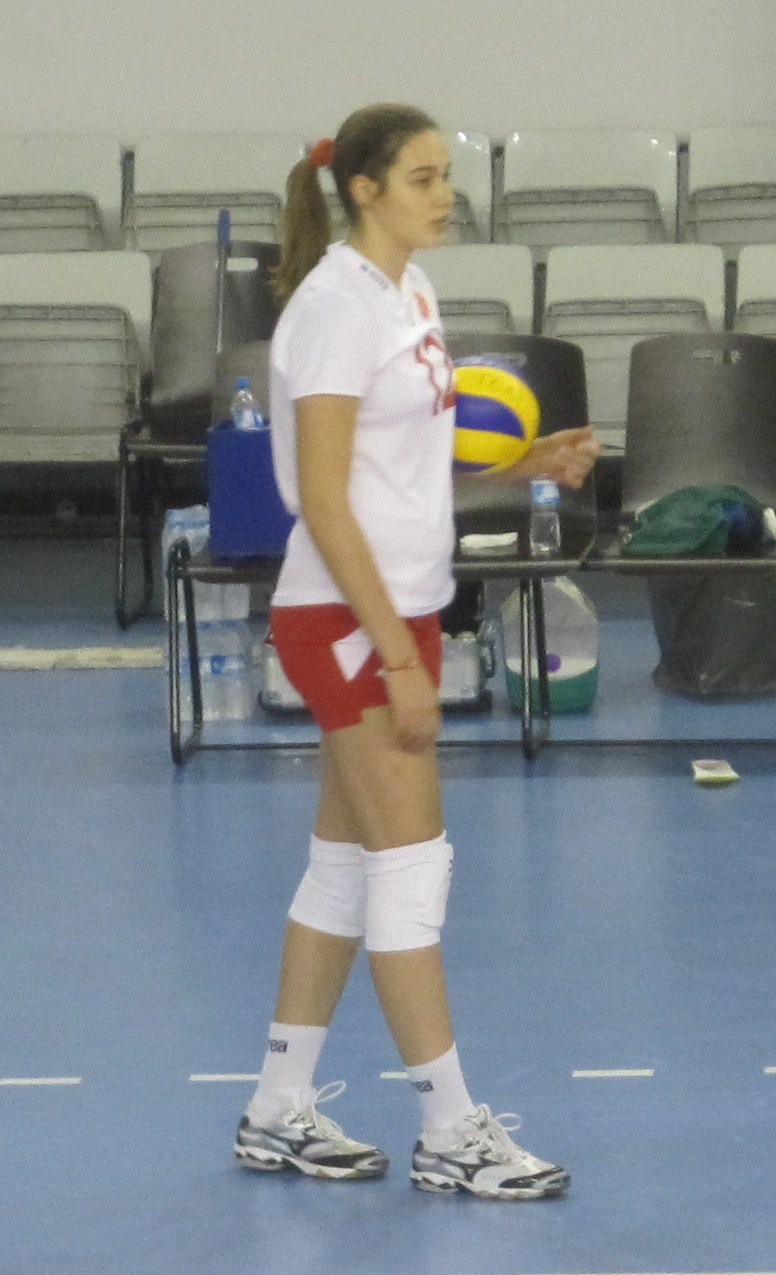

Personal information
- Born: February 7, 1994 (age 32); İzmir, Turkey
- Height: 1.89 m (6 ft 2 1/2 in)
- Weight: 86 kg (190 lb)
- Spike: 294 cm (116 in)
- Block: 290 cm (110 in)

Volleyball information
- Position: Hitter
- Current club: (Turkey) Arkas Spor
- Number: 12

Career
Years	Teams
2005-2009; 2009-2011; 2011-2012; 2012-2013	(Turkey) Karşıyaka (Turkey) TVF Sport High School (Turkey) VakıfBank Türk Telekom (Turkey) Karşıyaka 2014- (Turkey) Arkas Spor

National team
2010-	Turkey
Honours
Women's volleyball
Representing Turkey women's youth national volleyball team
Girls Youth World Championship
Gold medal – first place	2011 Ankara	Team

Melisa Kerman (born February 7, 1994, in İzmir, Turkey) is a Turkish female volleyball player. She is 189 cm (6.20 ft) tall at 86 kg (190 lb) and plays as hitter. In July 2012, she returned to her first club Karşıyaka, which competes in the Turkish Women's Volleyball Second League. Kerman is a member of the Turkey women's youth national volleyball team, and wears number 12.

Born to a volletballer mother in Izmir, she began with volleyball at the age of eleven in the Karşıyaka. Three years later, she managed to play in the A-team of her club. Due to her tallness, Melisa was admitted also to the basketball team, where she played two years long during her secondary school.

== Clubs ==
- (Turkey) Karşıyaka İzmir (2005-2009)
- (Turkey) TVF Sport High School (2009-2011)
- (Turkey) VakıfBank Türk Telekom (2011-2012)
- (Turkey) Karşıyaka (2012-2013)

== Awards ==
=== National team ===
- 2011 FIVB Girls Youth World Championship - Gold

== See also ==
- Turkish women in sports
