= Melisa Whiskey =

British-Nigerian Afropop singer

- Born: Melisa Abimbola
- Genres: Afrobeat; hip hop; EDM
- Occupations: Vocalist, singer
- Years active: 2017–present
- Label: Strictly Rhythm
- Website: melisawhiskey.com

Melisa Abimbola, better known as Melisa Whiskey is a British–Nigerian Afropop singer and songwriter. She is mostly known for her songs Billin, Ajeh, Thredhold etc.

== Career ==
Whiskey was born in Hackney and raised in Bray Towers Camden, London. She had been introduced to Gospel & soul music at a young age through her father, a music enthusiast and historian who had been born in Leeds. Melisa signed her first publishing deal with BMG in 2015. During her time at Leicester University, Melisa performed open mic nights and gradually gathered support from BBC Music Introducing. When she released her first track "Played" in 2016, she received recognition from BBC Radio 1Xtra’s Twin B and subsequently playlisted on BBC Radio 1Xtra. Melisa's collaboration with Redlight, Thredhold entered the BBC Radio 1 Dance Chart and reached spot 39. In the same year she collaborated in the song Searching with Harry Romero and Roger Sanchez on the Strictly Rhythmn label. By March 2017 she released her song Sweetest Cake. She also collaborated in the song Maybe Now with STéLOUSE. Later in 2017 Melisa released an extended play record called The Moon + The Sky. Billin, the song with a mixture of pop and hip hop, was one of the most popular tracks out of this EP and was playlisted on BBC Radio London. In 2019, Whiskey teamed with Mystro, to introduce her single Ajeh as well as Bonjour which was produced by E- Kelly. In December 2019, Whiskey performed at O2 Forum Kentish Town with Afro beats Artist Mr Eazi.

== Discography ==
=== Singles ===
- Threshold (With Redlight) – 2015
- Played – 2016
- Maybe Now (with STéLOUSE) – 2016
- Sweetest Cake – 2017
- Cuffin or Cuttin' – 2017
- Billin – 2017
- Bonjour – 2018
- Ajeh – 2019
- Crazy Love – 2020

=== EP ===
- Moon + The Sky - 2017

== Chart ==
Song	Chart	Peak position
Thresold	BBC Radio 1 Dance Chart	39
