= Ljubno ob Savinji =

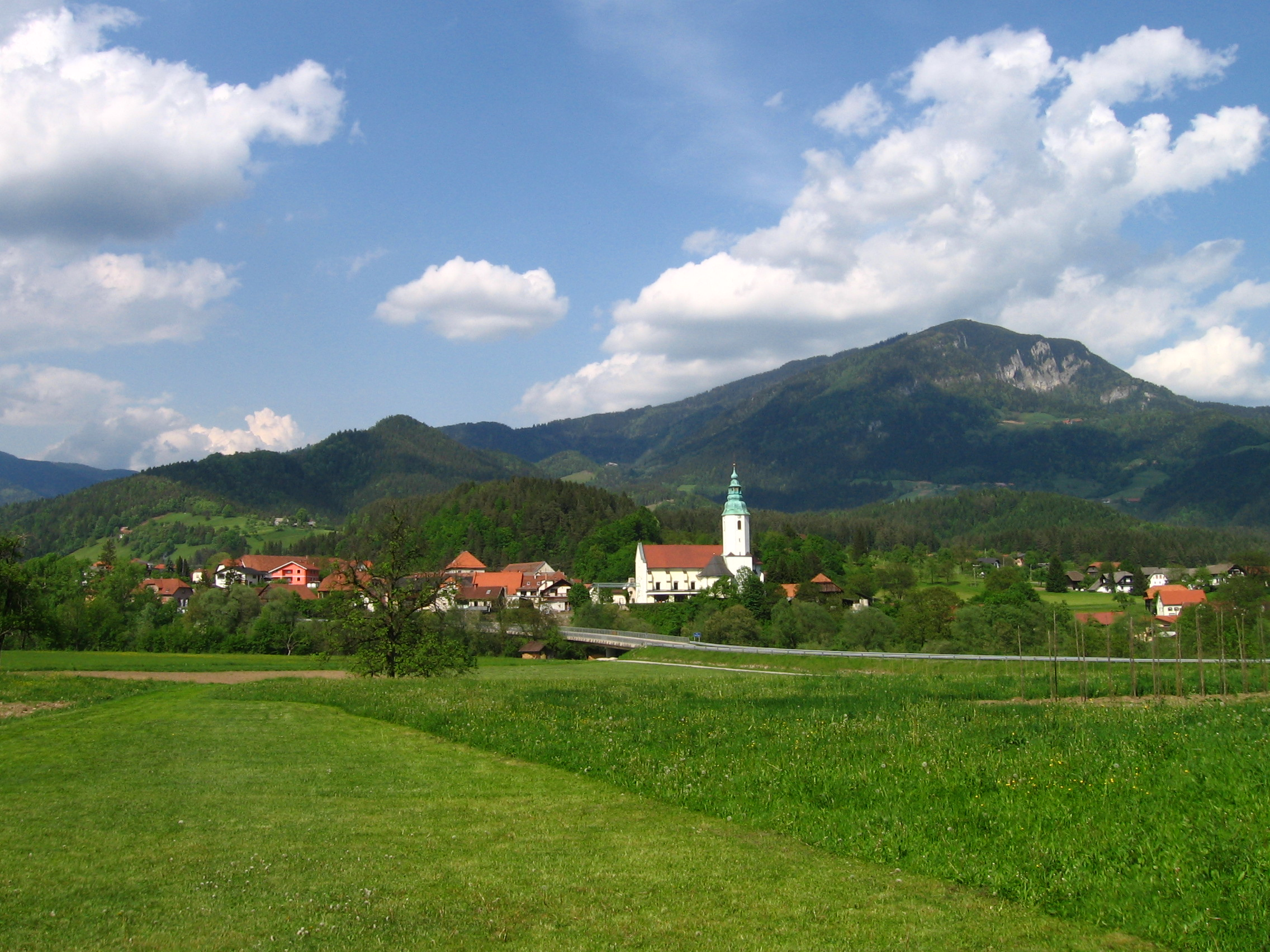

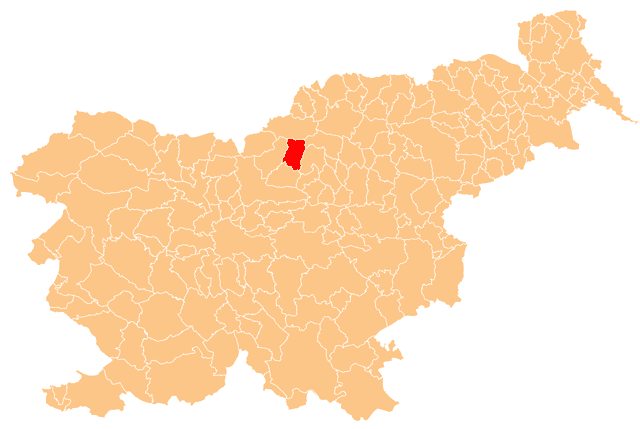

- Location of Ljubno in Slovenia
- Coordinates: 46°20′N 14°50′E
- Country: Slovenia

Government
  - Mayor: Franjo Naraločnik

Area
  - Total: 1.7 km^{2} (0.66 sq mi)

Population (2012)
  - Total: 1,094
  - Density: 632/km^{2} (1,640/sq mi)
- Time zone: UTC+01 (CET)
  - Summer (DST): UTC+02 (CEST)

Ljubno ob Savinji (pronounced [ˈljuːbnɔ ɔp saˈʋiːnji]; German: Laufen) is the largest settlement and the centre of the Municipality of Ljubno on the upper course of the Savinja River in Slovenia. The town is referred to as Ljubno ob Savinji in order to distinguish it from other settlements named Ljubno. Traditionally it belonged to the region of Styria and is now included in the Savinja Statistical Region. The settlement was first mentioned in written documents dating to 1247, and by 1442 it was classified as a market town.

== Landmarks ==
=== St. Elizabeth's Parish Church ===
The parish church in the settlement is dedicated to Saint Elizabeth. It was first mentioned in 1308 and rebuilt in the 15th century. It has a rectangular nave, added chapels, a three-sided apse, and a southern belfry. It belongs to the Roman Catholic Diocese of Celje.
