= List of Time Team Podcast episodes =

Episodes of British archaeology television show

The following is a list of episodes of the Podcast version of the British television/web programme about archaeology, Time Team.

In 2024, Time Team's archaeological expert, Dr Helen Geake and broadcaster, Martyn Williams began the podcast. Originally a fortnightly release, the podcast is now released weekly, every Tuesday. The podcast delves into the world of archaeology, offering exclusive access to digs and interviews with experts to uncover the stories of the past. Helen Geake also answers archaeological questions from the members of the Time Team crowdfunding platform, Patreon. The podcast is an accompanying format to the YouTube version of Time Team.

In February 2026, series 3 introduced subscriber-only Bonus Episodes via the Patreon platform.

The episode numbers follow the order of the first transmission.

== Series overview ==
Series	Episodes		Originally released	
Series	Episodes		First released	Last released
1	9		3 September 2024	24 December 2024
2	47		7 January 2025	30 December 2025
3	55	7	January 6, 2026	February 17, 2026
3	55	Bonus 1	February 17, 2025	
3	55	4	February 24, 2026	March 17, 2026
3	55	Bonus 2	February 17, 2026	
3	55	2	March 24, 2026	March 31, 2016
3	55	Bonus 3	March 31, 2026	
3	55	4	April 7, 2026	April 28, 2026
3	55	Bonus 4	April 28, 2026	
3	55	4	May 5, 2026	May 26, 2026
3	55	Bonus 5	May 26, 2026	
3	55	4	June 2, 2026	June 23, 2026
3	55	Bonus 6	June 23, 2026	
3	55	1	June 30, 2026	June 30, 2026
3	55	Bonus 7	June 30, 2026	
3	55	11	July 7, 2026	September 15, 2026
3	55	Bonus 8	September 15, 2026	
3	55	4	September 22, 2026	October 13, 2026
3	55	Bonus 9	October 13, 2026	
3	55	5	October 20, 2026	November 17, 2026

== Series One ==
No. overall	No. in series	Title	Guests	Original release date
1	1	"Shakespeare's hidden stage"	Tim Taylor and Sophie Kay	3 September 2024
Dr Helen Geake and Martyn Williams discover the stage, hidden for hundreds of years, where William Shakespeare performed, Time Team's creator, Tim Taylor, explains where he originally got the idea for the hit Channel 4 programme in 1994, ancestry and genealogy expert Dr Sophie Kay has great advice on how to be the historian of your own family tree and Stewart Ainsworth reveals the importance of maps in uncovering the secrets of a landscape.
2	2	"Roman villa unearthed in suburbia"	Francesca Giarelli, Jon Beaver and Tim Taylor	17 September 2024
Helen and Martyn speak to Francesca Giarelli from Red River Archaeology about a Roman villa hidden under a new housing development in Oxfordshire. Martyn talks about meeting up with digger driver Jon Beaver to have a go in his "big yellow trowel" and Time Team's creator, Tim Taylor talks about how he managed to persuade Channel 4 to take the risk to broadcast the programme in 1994.
3	3	"England's Pompeii"	Mark Knight, Stewart Ainsworth and Tim Taylor	17 September 2024
Helen and Martyn hear about the latest discoveries at a site dubbed England's Pompeii. Mark Knight, from the Cambridge Archaeological Unit, talks about how the Bronze Age settlement, home to around 60 people, burned down in 850BC but has been almost-perfectly preserved, giving a snapshot of what life in Cambridgeshire was like around 3,000 years ago. Stewart Ainsworth is out in a muddy field with Martyn, explaining how LiDAR can be used to reveal hidden secrets about a landscape. Time Team creator, Tim Taylor, talks about what happened when Sir Tony Robinson became involved with the programme and Helen will be answering more of the questions from Patreon members.
4	4	"Time Team dig at Norton Disney"	Carenza Lewis	15 October 2024
In this special episode, Helen and Martyn broadcast from an archaeological dig at Norton Disney in Lincolnshire, the ancestral home of Walt Disney himself. Discover what it's like to be part of a Time Team dig and hear from archaeologists in the Time Team family who've been working on site, as well as the volunteers who've been digging test pits in the front gardens of bungalows in the village, and both Helen and Time Team's Carenza Lewis will be sharing their memories of the first ever episode of Time Team and answering your questions.
5	5	"Returning to Sutton Hoo"	Martin Carver	29 October 2024
Helen and Martyn hear from Professor Martin Carver, who carried out major excavations of the Sutton Hoo site in the 1980s. Finding out more about the burial mounds, the buried Anglo-Saxon ship and the exotic Byzantine bucket, Carver explains why it's such an important place archaeologically and how it still holds secrets to this day. Also on the podcast, Stewart Ainsworth puts Martyn through his paces as he undergoes the final bit of his basic training as a landscape archaeologist, the show's creator, Tim Taylor, talks about the biggest challenges faced by the crew when putting together a programme, and there's more Patreon member questions, this time with an added surprise.
6	6	"Metal detectors and dog tags"	Keith Wescott and Giselle Király	12 November 2024
Helen and Martyn take you deeper into the world of archaeology with the help of Time Team. Keith Wescott demonstrates how to use a metal detector to unearth rare finds, Giselle Király updates us on a rare folded dog tag, found whilst digging a site where the famous Band of Brothers had trained during the Second World War and meet the technical wizard behind Time Team's lifelike 3D graphics. Plus Helen answers more of the Patreon member questions.
7	7	"Gladiator blades and eastern treasures"	Lin Xin and Matt Williams	26 November 2024
Helen and Martyn talk about the discovery of an ancient Roman knife handle found at Hadrian's Wall. Find out why it's not as recent a discovery as news reports might suggest. There's news from China where analysis of over one-thousand artefacts are only just starting to reveal new secrets about the people of Sanxingdui, in the western Sichuan province. Ling Xin from Archaeology Magazine explains what life might've been like in this hidden Chinese kingdom and we learn the perfect trowelling technique from Time Team's Matt Williams and the show's creator, Tim Taylor, lets you in on his hopes and plans for Time Team's future.
8	8	"Moats, masonry, and drone archaeology"	Jon Hart, Richard Parker and Harry Manley	10 December 2024
Find out about the discovery of a medieval moat around an ancient farm site near Tewkesbury with Jon Hart from Cotswold Archaeology. Meet Time Team’s buildings archaeologist, Richard Parker. He explains how analysing architecture can shed light on the way people used to live. Harry Manley demonstrates how getting up high above the landscape with a drone can benefit the archaeology being done on the ground, plus, more Patreon member archaeology questions get answers.
9	9	"Time Team's Christmas quiz 2024"	Derek Pitman	10 December 2024
Time Team's Helen Geake and Derek Pitman go head to head in a Christmas edition quiz. Members of the Time Team family provide the questions to find out if they really know their stuff and co-host Martyn Williams has a special festive surprise for Helen and Derek as they perform Twas The Night Before Time Team.

== Series Two ==
No. overall	No. in series	Title	Guests	Original release date
10	1	"Your questions answered"	Derek Pitman	7 January 2025
The first episode of the Time Team podcast for 2025 is a little different. Archaeologists Dr Helen Geake and Dr Derek Pitman answer questions you've been asking on Patreon. From how new technology might change the way archaeologists make discoveries to what happens after the diggers have left a site, Helen and Derek give you their thoughts on what you've been wondering.
11	2	"From Sutton Hoo to Byzantium- Did Anglo-Saxons fight for the Empire?"	Helen Gittos	21 January 2025
Helen and Martyn take us to Sutton Hoo, where Time Team will be returning later this year. Find out more about a new theory - put forward by Dr Helen Gittos from the University of Oxford - which casts doubt on the current understanding of how opulent Byzantine treasures, found in some of the burial mounds, came to be there. Could it be that Anglo-Saxons were fighting in the Byzantine army? Also hear from the volunteers who are attempting to recreate the 27 metre-long longship which has made Sutton Hoo famous. How close are they to completing the project?
12	3	"New excavations at Pompeii"	Sophie Hay and Meg Russell	4 February 2025
Helen and Martyn discover Pompeii like you've never seen it before. New excavations at the site have been unearthing perfectly-preserved bathhouses, skeletons and jewellery which allow us to learn even more about life in the ancient city before it was destroyed by a volcano. Dr Sophie Hay was heavily involved in the dig and takes us through the most breathtaking discoveries. Also, Martyn revisits the site of an old Time Team dig in the Cotswolds, where an exciting discovery has been made. Plus, Time Team's Meg Russell tells us how archaeology is a family affair with three generations involved in the discipline, and Helen answers more of your questions submitted on Patreon.
13	4	"The forgotten women of Iron Age Britain"	Rachel Pope, Henry Chapman, Brigid Gallagher and Raysan al-Kubaisi	18 February 2025
In this episode, Rachel Pope from The University of Liverpool explains how new research is lifting the veil on the lives of women in Iron Age Britain. Martyn tries out one of the most back-breaking archaeological techniques as Prof. Henry Chapman demonstrates coring. There's a trip down memory lane as former Time Team Principal Conservation Expert, Brigid Gallagher, and former Time Team 3D graphic artist, Raysan al-Kubaisi, share their stories of life on Time Team in our Channel 4 days. Helen also answers more of your questions from Patreon.
14	5	"The toilet that solved the mystery of the Bayeux Tapestry"	Duncan Wright, Dani Wootton and Meg Russell	4 March 2025
Dr Duncan Wright from Newcastle University explains how an 11th-century royal toilet has allowed researchers to prove the location of King Harold's residence, solving a mystery of the famous Bayeux Tapestry. Also joining Helen and Martyn is Dani Wootton, who'll bring you this month's Time Team News. Meg Russell explains the science behind the mental health benefits of archaeology, and there'll be more of your Patreon questions answered.
15	6	"What life was really like in Ancient Egypt"	Joyce Tyldesley, Lawrence Shaw and Naomi Sewpaul	18 March 2025
Helen and Martyn are joined by this year's winner of The Archaeologist of the Year award. Joyce Tyldesley OBE is Professor of Egyptology, and she's poised to reveal some of the civilisation's secrets. Also, Lawrence Shaw gets you excited about this weekend's Time Team expedition crew YouTube video, and Naomi Sewpaul demonstrates an archaeological technique called floatation. Plus, Helen and Martyn have an exciting announcement about the future of the podcast.
16	7	"Do people really let archaeologists dig up their garden?"	Helen Geake	25 March 2025
It's our first Patreon questions episode! Dr Helen Geake brings you answers to some of the things you've always wondered about archaeology. From how to get involved in digs to whether people are really ok with dozens of archaeologists digging huge holes in their lawns, we've got the answers to your questions. Plus, Helen tells Martyn about a historical object and discusses its importance.
17	8	"Stewart Ainsworth's remarkable discovery at Iron Age landmark"	Stewart Ainsworth, Nigel Jeffries and Dani Wootton	1 April 2025
Landscape archaeologist Stewart Ainsworth takes Martyn to Bodbury Ring in Shropshire, where he's made an astonishing new discovery which could completely change the way we think about the Iron Age site. Helen delves deeper into witchcraft as she investigates curious witch bottles with Nigel Jeffries from Museum of London Archaeology, and Dani Wootton is back with the latest Time Team news.
18	9	"The Bronze Age object nobody can explain"	Gus Casely-Hayford	8 April 2025
Helen and Martyn are joined by Gus Casely-Hayford OBE to answer your archaeology questions. Learn the difference between coring and flotation, discover what commercial archaeology units do, debate the benefits of using plaster casts over a more technological solution, and consider another theory on Roman stairs. Helen finds that this episode is a penannular ring and discovers how it has been baffling historians for decades, and Gus shares exciting updates on a brand new V&A museum coming to London soon.
19	10	"Britain's lost underwater Kingdom"	Vincent Gaffney, Caroline Wilkinson and Keith Wescott	15 April 2025
Professor Vincent Gaffney, chair in landscape archaeology at the University of Bradford, discusses Doggerland, an area of land now submerged under the North Sea off the coast of Britain. Professor Caroline Wilkinson, a world-leading expert in facial reconstruction, explains how new techniques allow you to look into the eyes of people from the past and metal detectorist Keith Wescott takes Martyn to the place where he discovered a huge Roman villa.
20	11	"Did Vikings really wear horned helmets?"	Helen Geake	22 April 2025
Helen answers more of your questions in this episode of the Time Team podcast. From whether Vikings really wore horned helmets to why the police aren't called in every time a skeleton is discovered at a site, plus there's also another edition of Helen's Find.
21	12	"Francis Pryor on the threat facing Flag Fen"	Francis Pryor, Rob Watts and Dani Wootton	29 April 2025
Time Team's Francis Pryor discovered Flag Fen, a Bronze Age site of world importance, in 1982. Helen and Martyn speak to self-proclaimed 'word nerd' Rob Watts from the etymology YouTube channel RobWords, and Dani Wootton brings you archaeology stories from around the world in Time Team News and Helen will answer more questions from Patreon supporters.
22	13	"Is there a dark side of metal detecting?"	Helen Geake	6 May 2025
Helen responds to the questions members have been asking on Patreon, including the dark side of metal detecting, whether our ancestors were buried or cremated, and why farmers can continue to plough the soil at scheduled monuments. Plus, Helen's find this week is a spindle whorl.
23	14	"Understanding Sutton Hoo's Bromeswell bucket"	Giselle Király	13 May 2025
With just one week to go until Time Team returns to Sutton Hoo, Martyn and Helen find out even more about one of its unearthed treasures, the Bromeswell Bucket. Martyn visits one of the UK's largest Iron Age hillforts in Oswestry to discover how vandalism is endangering its archaeology. With fears about the future of university funding for archaeology courses, commercial archaeologist Giselle Király talks about job opportunities in the industry. Plus, Helen answers more of your questions submitted on Patreon.
24	15	"The Sutton Hoo dig gets underway"	Martin Carver and Laura Howarth	20 May 2025
Helen and Martyn are at Sutton Hoo, where Time Team's 2025 dig has just started. Professor Martin Carver, who led an excavation of the famous Sutton Hoo mounds in the 1980s, is on site with his thoughts on the project. Sutton Hoo's archaeology and engagement manager, Laura Howarth, shares with us what she hopes the 2025 dig will reveal about life in the area. Martyn explores the burial ground for himself, and there's finally some information to share on the Bromeswell bucket.
25	16	"Sutton Hoo gives up more secrets"	John Gater and Jackie McKinley	27 May 2025
Helen and Martyn bring you this episode of the Time Team podcast from Sutton Hoo, where our second year on site is underway. John Gater explains how he hopes new geophysics technology might shed some light on mysterious signals detected last year, and Jackie McKinley takes you through her analysis of the missing piece of the Bromeswell bucket. We also take a trip to Woodbridge, where the Sutton Hoo Ship's Company are reconstructing the Anglo-Saxon ship, discovered in one of the mounds in 1939.
26	17	"Sutton Hoo dig unearths cremation urn"	Tim FitzHigham	3 June 2025
Helen and Martyn are back at Sutton Hoo, where Time Team's dig is in its third week. Helen brings you up to speed with what's going on on site, including the latest on the cremation vessel that's been discovered in trench one. Martyn meets the volunteers, getting the opportunity to dig at Sutton Hoo, and Tim Fitzhigham from the Guildhall at King's Lynn drops by with an update on a project to bring Shakespeare's stage to life.
27	18	"Could another ship be buried at Sutton Hoo?"	Carenza Lewis	10 June 2025
It's Time Team's final week digging at Sutton Hoo, and it still has secrets to reveal. Helen and Martyn brave the wind and rain to take you to a new trench that's been opened on the bank of the river. Could they uncover another Anglo-Saxon ship there? Helen's been squelching in the mud on the side of the river at low tide, where Carenza Lewis and her team are looking for evidence of human activity from thousands of years ago. You'll also meet the volunteers who've been given the chance to excavate test pits thanks to their support for Time Team on Patreon.
28	19	"The Sutton Hoo debrief"	Naomi Sewpaul	17 June 2025
Helen and Martyn sit down after four weeks of Time Team's Sutton Hoo dig to reflect on what's happened over the past month. Naomi Sewpaul discusses her work on site and sheds some light on what she may have discovered using her special floatation tank. You'll meet one of Edith Pretty's relatives, who reflects on the legacy of the woman who owned the site and sparked the archaeological digs of the 1930s, which discovered one of the buried Anglo-Saxon ships. One of our Patreon volunteers tells you what she got up to when she got the chance to spend a day as an archaeologist at Sutton Hoo, thanks to Time Team.
29	20	"Mudlarking for London's lost history"	Tim Coghlan, Tim Taylor and Dani Wootton	24 June 2025
Searching for treasure in the mud on the banks of the river Thames, or mudlarking as it's known, dates back generations. Now, specially licensed mudlarks comb the foreshore looking for clues to the city's past. You'll meet Tom Coghlan, who discovered something truly remarkable, now on display at a new exhibition at the London Museum focusing on mudlarking. Also on the podcast, archaeologist Dr Helen Geake and co-host Martyn Williams speak to Time Team's creator Tim Taylor who's been awarded an MBE in the King's birthday honours. Community archaeology project 1722 Waggonway gears up for another dig to understand the country's first wooden railway. Plus, Dani Wootton is back with Time Team News.
30	21	"Could you be related to an ancient King?"	Helen Geake	1 July 2025
Another episode devoted to answering the questions members have been asking on Patreon. Time Team archaeologist Dr Helen Geake considers whether DNA could discover the ancestors of ancient Kings who are alive today, how long archaeology has been studied and the measures in place to stop artefacts being stolen from a dig site. There's also Helen's Find. This time, Helen's discussing seal matrices, the metal objects used to stamp wax seals on letters.
31	22	"Potential Viking boat burial on Shetland"	Jackie McKinley and Saskia Stevens	8 July 2025
Helen and Martyn are joined by Time Team archaeologist Jackie McKinley. She's been part of the team investigating a potential Viking boat burial in the northernmost part of the UK. Archaeologists have discovered evidence of a Roman temporary camp in the Netherlands. It's been found north of the known frontier of the empire. What does it mean for our understanding of the Romans? Dr Saskia Stevens from Utrecht University will shed some light on her research. Martyn investigates the complexities of magnetometry and how they can help the archaeological process and Patreon supporters pose their questions to Helen.
32	23	"Why don't archaeologists deal with dinosaurs?"	Helen Geake	15 July 2025
In this question and answers episode Dr Helen Geake brings you her thoughts on archaeology-related queries posed by Patreon supporters. She'll tackle topics about the difference between palaeontology and archaeology, what's done with partially excavated human remains on a dig and whether or not the Anglo-Saxon invasion happened in the way the history books suggest. There's also another edition of Helen's Find, where Helen talks about another exciting object. This time it's a metal arrowhead.
33	24	"The 5,000 year old man found frozen in the snow"	Giselle Király, Derek Pitman, Lawrence Shaw and Louise Bedford	22 July 2025
Time Team's Giselle Király is in the Italian Dolomites, discovering human remains left frozen in the ice for 5,000 years. The Festival of Archaeology is in full swing at venues across the UK. Derek Pitman and Lawrence Shaw have been at the festival's launch. Louise Bedford, an archaeology student, has created her own video game that allows you to explore a real dig. Helen answers more questions from Patreon supporters, and Dani Wootton has this month's edition of Time Team News.
34	25	"How did the Romans stay warm?"	Helen Geake	29 July 2025
It's another question and answer session this week. Archaeologist Dr Helen Geake is taking the questions members have been asking on Patreon. She'll discuss how rich Romans heated their villas in chilly northern Europe, whether archaeologists behave differently around human remains depending on the religion the deceased person might've been from, and how to date pottery.
35	26	"Meeting the Little Boy Blue dig heroes"	Francis Pryor, Lawrence Shaw and Derek Pitman	5 August 2025
Time Team's Francis Pryor appears on this episode of the podcast to discuss the damage to one of Flag Fen's reconstructed roundhouses. You'll hear from Derek Pitman and Lawrence Shaw, who've been at the Festival of Archaeology's launch event near Belfast in Northern Ireland. The Operation Nightingale military veterans and serving members of the armed forces talk about their experience digging for a B-17 bomber, Little Boy Blue, which crashed in a field around 80 years ago.
36	27	"How much does a Time Team dig cost?"	Helen Geake	12 August 2025
Helen Geake and Martyn Williams are back with some of the questions Time Team members have been asking. From discussing advances in archaeological technology to the cost of running a dig, Helen does her best to bring you answers. Martyn also has a go at asking a question, putting forward the silurian hypothesis for Helen to consider. There's also another edition of Helen's Find.
37	28	"Sutton Hoo ship reconstruction update"	Alexandra Makin and Dani Wootton	19 August 2025
Helen and Martyn are at Flag Fen, where a fire has destroyed a volunteer-built roundhouse on the ancient archaeological site. Helen sees the damage for herself. Jacq Barnard from The Sutton Hoo Ship's Company has an update on the work that's underway to reconstruct the Anglo-Saxon ship buried in the mounds at Sutton Hoo. With the Bayeux Tapestry coming to the UK, Helen and Martyn speak to Dr Alexandra Makin, a medieval embroidery expert. Dani Wootton has Time Team News, and Helen is answering more questions from Time Team members.
38	29	"Busting a Hadrian's Wall myth"	Helen Geake	26 August 2025
Helen and Martyn are back at Flag Fen to answer questions from Time Team members. This time, they tackle how much an occupying Roman force might've mingled with the locals, the newest find Helen has come across, myth-busting a tall tale about Hadrian's Wall, and doing archaeology in your later years.
39	30	"How one village helped tell Walt Disney's remarkable family story"	Carenza Lewis and Giles Emery	2 September 2025
Helen and Martyn get you ready for Time Team's next three-day dig, which took place in the village of Norton Disney. You'll hear from Time Team's own Carenza Lewis, who got the whole community involved in digging their own past at test pits in gardens and fields across the local area. Time Team members have been able to see an exclusive preview, so Helen and Martyn get the thoughts of Julie, who was one of the first to watch the episode. There's also a trip to Oswestr,y where volunteers with English Heritage are helping to preserve the archaeology at an ancient hill fort. They've got help too, in the form of a herd of sheep! Plus, archaeologist Giles Emery is in Caistor St Edmund near Norwich, where a huge team of enthusiasts are excavating the largest Roman town in the area.
40	31	"How ethnically diverse was Anglo-Saxon society?"	Helen Geake	9 September 2025
Dr Helen Geake answers questions from Time Team members. In this episode you'll hear Helen's thoughts on mysterious stones in Cornwall, diversity in Anglo-Saxon society and how much British influence might there have been on the European continent? Helen also introduces you to another item from the Portable Antiquities Scheme, an ancient brooch.
41	32	"The lost abbey beside the Cerne Abbas chalk giant"	Lawrence Shaw and Matt Williams	16 September 2025
Dr Helen Geake gives us the low down from Sir Tony Robinson's book launch in London. Lawrence Shaw takes you to Cerne Abbas where a dig to rediscover a lost abbey just metres from the famous chalk giant has been taking place, and Matt Williams has thoughts on that as he takes you to a National Trust dig at Attingham where secrets of a huge abandonded Roman city are being uncovered, and Helen answers questions from Time Team members.
42	33	"How do Roman villas get forgotten about?"	Helen Geake	23 September 2025
This episode Dr Helen Geake answers more of your questions, including whether special vaccinations are needed to dig up ancient human remains and how necessary it is to cut down vegetation to conduct a geophysical survey. Helen's Find also returns, with an object close to Helen's heart.
43	34	"Back to Brancaster's Roman fort"	John Gater, Francis Pryor, Stewart Ainsworth and Jimmy Adcock	23 September 2025
Time Team return to the Roman fort at Brancaster in Norfolk with John Gater and the geophysics team. Helen Geake and Martyn Williams take you behind the scenes of the filming of a brand new Time Team programme. John and his team fire up their magnetrometry and GPR equipment to discover so much more about this amazing site. You'll hear conversations with John Gater, Jimmy Adcock, Stewart Ainsworth and Francis Pryor. Plus, Martyn gets a ride in the geophysics buggy to see how it all happens. John also answers questions about geophysics.
44	35	"Mick Aston's Time Team legacy"	Helen Geake	7 October 2025
Helen Geake and Martyn Williams reflect on Mick Aston's legacy on Time Team. Helen answers questions from Patreon members about the rules around metal detecting and the benefits of LiDAR technology. Helen's Find returns, this time a humble pencil, or is it?
45	36	"Saving Henry VIII's flagship The Mary Rose"	Alex Hilded, Dominic Jones, David Pearson	14 October 2025
Martyn gets up close to the ship, going behind the scenes at the Mary Rose Museum, Helen interviews Dr Alex Hildred who shares stories of what it's like doing archaeology underwater and Dominic Jones and David Pearson wgi are responsible for the conservation of the ship.
46	37	"A local lad done bad"	Helen Geake	21 October 2025
Helen Geake answers more questions from Time Team members and shares a remarkable story in Helen's Find, and we learn all about Sir Clement Higham, a fairly unlikeable character, through the silver vervel.
47	38	"How archaeology can solve crimes"	Stewart Ainsworth, Henry Chapman, Jono Lightfoot, Suzy Watts	28 October 2025
Helen and Martyn chat to Time Team's landscape archaeologist Stewart Ainsworth, about tackling heritage crime; Martyn visits Professor Henry Chapman to find out more about bog bodies; and Suzy Watts from the National Trust has an update on what's been going on at the Attingham estate.
48	39	"How can AI revolutionise archaeology?"	Helen Geake	4 November 2025
Helen Geake answers questions from Time Team members and ponders the benefits AI might bring to archaeologists and geophysicists in the field.
49	40	"The war veteran saved by archaeology"	Helen Geake	11 November 2025
Helen and Martyn speak to one veteran whose life has been changed through Operation Nightingale, a project which uses archaeology to help veterans and serving military personnel suffering with their mental health, and we meet the two experts who led the Cerne Abbas project.
50	41	"Could archaeology become obsolete?"	Helen Geake	18 November 2025
Helen and Martyn are back for another edition of the Time Team podcast. This week, Helen answers questions from Time Team members and discusses archaeologists' arguments, what you might find in a First World War trench, and she will ponder if archaeology could become obsolete.
51	42	"Surprise discovery in the heart of Neolithic Orkney"	Helen Geake, Derek Pitman	25 November 2025
Helen and Martyn take you to the north of the British Isles, where John Gater has an exciting announcement to bring you about a remarkable Neolithic site in Orkney, The Ness of Brodgar, we hear about a site first investigated by Time Team in 1994, and Derek Pitman also has news of a Time Team film about England's oldest surviving shipwreck.
52	43	"Orkney's shipwreck mystery: Sanday Wreck"	Ben Saunders	2 December 2025
In this special edition of the Time Team podcast, Helen Geake and Martyn Williams speak to Ben Saunders, senior marine archaeologist at Wessex Archaeology, who has made some remarkable discoveries about a wooden shipwreck that was revealed on a beach in Orkney
53	44	"Sir Tony Robinson"	Tony Robinson	9 December 2025
In this special edition of the Time Team podcast, archaeologist Helen Geake speaks to the man who's been at the heart of Time Team since the very beginning, Sir Tony Robinson. Tony reveals how he came to present the show, discusses his love of archaeology and talks about his new book, The House of Wolf.
54	45	"Can new tech unroll ancient scrolls?"	Helen Geake	16 December 2025
Helen's answering questions from Time Team members. We discuss when a buried body becomes archaeology, and we remember the late Time Team member, Kerry Ely.
55	46	"The Time Team Christmas Quiz 2025"	Helen Geake, Derek Pitman	23 December 2025
Helen and Derek compete in the Time Team Christmas Quiz and take questions from members.
56	47	"The best bits from 2025"	Helen Geake and Guests	30 December 2025
Helen and Martyn look back over the best bits of the Time Team Podcast during 2025.

== Series Three ==
No. overall	No. in series	Title	Guests	Original release date
57	1	"Sutton Hoo ship update and more 2025 best bits"	Helen Geake and Guests	6 January 2026
Helen and Martyn look back at more of their favourites from the Time Team podcast in 2025.
58	2	"Remarkable Iron Age battle trumpet unearthed"	TBA	13 January 2026
59	3	"The everyday ancient objects lost to archaeology"	TBA	20 January 2026
60	4	"Princely graves, symbols, and Anglo-Saxon England"	TBA	27 January 2026
61	5	"Incredible discoveries at nuclear power station site"	TBA	3 February 2026
62	6	"Tony Robinson celebrates five years of Time Team’s return"	TBA	10 February 2026
63	7	"17th century shipwreck appears on Dorset beach"	TBA	17 February 2026
64	B1	"Bonus Episode - Answering your Princely Burial questions"	TBA	17 February 2026
65	8	"Did the Iron Age happen at the same time everywhere?"	TBA	24 February 2026
66	9	"2,000-year-old footprints discovered on beach"	TBA	3 March 2026
67	10	"Why nobody's sure what furniture was in a roundhouse"	TBA	10 March 2026
68	11	"Hadrian's Wall and more at Current Archaeology Live"	TBA	17 March 2026
69	B2	"Bonus Episode - In the pub after Current Archaeology Live"	TBA	17 March 2026
70	12	"The truth about The Celts"	TBA	24 March 2026
71	13	"Excavating the Roman fort of Branodunum"	TBA	31 March 2026
73	B3	"Bonus Episode - Your Brancaster questions answered"	TBA	31 March 2026
74	14	"Understanding Brancaster's Roman fort"	TBA	7 April 2026
75	15	"Has Time Team discovered a lost Roman site?"	TBA	14 April 2026
76	16	"The archaeology of language"	TBA	21 April 2026
77	17	"The maps that unlock your family tree secrets"	TBA	28 April 2026
78	B4	"Bonus Episode - Princely Burial DNA revelations"	TBA	28 April 2026
79	18	"Plaque to the future"	TBA	5 May 2026
80	19	"Secrets of neolithic artificial island revealed"	TBA	12 May 2026
81	20	"What were ancient foofs built from?"	TBA	19 May 2026
82	21	"Did we discover a medieval village?"	TBA	26 May 2026
83	B5	"Bonus Episode - Stewart Ainsworth's thoughts on Kielder site"	TBA	26 May 2026
84	22	"What nobody knows about hill forts"	TBA	2 June 2026
85	23	"Who were the Picts, really?"	TBA	7 June 2026
86	24	"Could an Egyptian mummy be hiding in a field?"	TBA	16 June 2026
87	25	"Amazing Stonehenge discovery"	Phil Harding	23 June 2026
88	B6	"Bonus Episode - Digging deeper into Stonehenge discovery"	TBA	23 June 2026
89	26	"When recovering finds goes wrong"	TBA	30 June 2026
90	B7	"Bonus Episode - The ancient object Carenza Lewi would save"	TBA	30 June 2026
91	27	"Orkney's hidden stone circle?"	TBA	7 July 2026
92	28	"How did Romans grout their mosaics?"	TBA	14 July 2026
93	29	"Hidden Tudor tunnels at Henry VIII's palace?"	TBA	21 July 2026
94	30	"Your Ness of Brodgar questions answered"	TBA	28 July 2026
95	31	"Orkney neolithic site starts to reveal its secrets"	TBA	4 August 2026
96	32	"Is the Brodgar Butterfly really a butterfly?"	TBA	11 August 2026
97	33	"Digging a neolithic mystery on Orkney"	TBA	18 August 2026
98	34	"How heatwaves are revealing lost archaeology"	TBA	25 August 2026
99	35	"Bronze Age DNA discovery"	TBA	1 September 2026
100	36	"The real ledgent of King Arthur"	TBA	8 September 2026
101	37	"Bayeaux Tapestry arrives in London"	TBA	15 September 2026
102	B8	"Bonus Episode - Cerne Abbas dig explored"	TBA	15 September 2026
103	38	"The founding father of archaeology"	TBA	22 September 2026
104	39	"The Royal Navy's lost shipwreck"	TBA	29 September 2026
105	40	"Roman Britain in Twenty Towns"	TBA	6 October 2026
106	41	"Medieval leprosy hospital uncovered"	TBA	13 October 2026
107	B9	"Bonus Episode - Digging a medieval leprosy hospital"	TBA	13 October 2026
108	42	"Time Team live in Lincoln"	TBA	20 October 2026
109	43	"The search for a fallen WWII airman"	TBA	27 October 2026
110	44	"The revolutionary origins of language"	TBA	3 November 2026
111	45	"Iron Age treasure discovered on RAF site"	TBA	10 November 2026
112	46	"How much archaeology is there still to discover?"	TBA	17 November 2026
