= August 17 =

August 17 this year in various calendars
- Monday, 17 August 2026
Akan	Nkyidwo
Armenian	28 Nawasardi 1476
Aztec	Pānquetzaliztli 19, 12 Mazātl
Babylonian	3 Abu, 2337 SE
Balinese pawukon	Luang, Pepet, Kajeng, Sri, Umanis, Urukung, Coma of Medangkungan, Ludra, Erangan, Raksasa
Bengali	2 Bhadro, BS 1433
Chinese	Yin Water Pig・Exntended Net Mansion; Fire Horse Year, Month 7, Day 5 (Liqiu, 6 days until Chushu)
Common Era	17 August 2026 CE
Coptic	11 Mesori, AM 1742
Egyptian	3 Tybi, 2775 NE
Ethiopian	11 Naḥasē, 2018 Amätä Məhrät
French Republican	Décade III, Décadi de Thermidor de l'Année 234 de la République
Gregorian	17 August, AD 2026
Hebrew	4 Elul, AM 5786
Hindu	Hasta・Sādhya; Solar: 1 Bhādrapada, 1948 SE; Lunisolar: Pañcamī, Śukla pakṣa of Śrāvaṇa, 2083 VE; Rāudra・5127 KY・1,872,804
Icelandic	Mánudagur, 23 Heyannir 2026
Islamic	3 Rabi' al-awwal, AH 1448 (using tabular method)
ISO week date	2026-W34-1
Japanese	5 Fumizuki, Reiwa 8 (Risshū, 6 days until Shosho)
Julian	4 August, AD 2026 (AM 7534)
Julian day	2461270
Korean	5 Wonsungidal, 4359 DE
Maya	13.0.13.15.7; 0 Mol, 12 Manik
Roman	Pridie Nonas Augustas, MMDCCLXXIX AUC
Solar Hijri	26 Mordad, SH 1405
Tibetan	5 gro bzhin, me pho rta 2153 or 1772 or 1000

<<	August					>>
Su	Mo	Tu	We	Th	Fr	Sa
						1
2	3	4	5	6	7	8
9	10	11	12	13	14	15
16	17	18	19	20	21	22
23	24	25	26	27	28	29
30	31
2026

August 17 in recent years
2026 (Monday)
2025 (Sunday)
2024 (Saturday)
2023 (Thursday)
2022 (Wednesday)
2021 (Tuesday)
2020 (Monday)
2019 (Saturday)
2018 (Friday)
2017 (Thursday)

August 17 is the 229th day of the year (230th in leap years) in the Gregorian calendar; 136 days remain until the end of the year.

== Events ==
=== Pre-1600 ===
- 986 – Byzantine–Bulgarian wars: Battle of the Gates of Trajan: The Bulgarians under the Comitopuli Samuel and Aron defeat the Byzantine forces at the Gate of Trajan, with Byzantine Emperor Basil II barely escaping.
- 1186 – Georgenberg Pact: Ottokar IV, Duke of Styria and Leopold V, Duke of Austria sign a heritage agreement in which Ottokar gives his duchy to Leopold and to his son Frederick under the stipulation that Austria and Styria would henceforth remain undivided.
- 1386 – Karl Topia, the ruler of Princedom of Albania, forges an alliance with the Republic of Venice, committing to participate in all wars of the Republic and receiving coastal protection against the Ottomans in return.
- 1424 – Hundred Years' War: Battle of Verneuil: An English force under John, Duke of Bedford defeats a larger French army under Jean II, Duke of Alençon, John Stewart, and Earl Archibald of Douglas.
- 1488 – Konrad Bitz, the Bishop of Turku, marks the date of his preface to Missale Aboense, the oldest known book of Finland.
- 1498 – Cesare Borgia, son of Pope Alexander VI, becomes the first person in history to resign the cardinalate; later that same day, King Louis XII of France names him Duke of Valentinois.
- 1549 – Battle of Sampford Courtenay: The Prayer Book Rebellion is quashed in England.
- 1560 – The Catholic Church is overthrown and Protestantism is established as the national religion in Scotland.
- 1585 – Eighty Years' War: Siege of Antwerp: Antwerp is captured by Spanish forces under Alexander Farnese, Duke of Parma, who orders Protestants to leave the city and as a result over half of the 100,000 inhabitants flee to the northern provinces.
- 1585 – A first group of colonists sent by Sir Walter Raleigh under the charge of Ralph Lane lands in the New World to create Roanoke Colony on Roanoke Island, off the coast of present-day North Carolina.
- 1597 – Islands Voyage: Robert Devereux, 2nd Earl of Essex, and Sir Walter Raleigh set sail on an expedition to the Azores.

=== 1601–1900 ===
- 1648 – The Parliamentarians defeat a English Royalist and Scottish army in the battle of Preston.
- 1668 – The magnitude 8.0 North Anatolia earthquake causes 8,000 deaths in northern Anatolia, Ottoman Empire.
- 1717 – Austro-Turkish War of 1716–18: The month-long Siege of Belgrade ends with Prince Eugene of Savoy's Austrian troops capturing the city from the Ottoman Empire.
- 1723 – Ioan Giurgiu Patachi becomes Bishop of Făgăraș and is festively installed in his position at the St. Nicolas Cathedral in Făgăraș, after being formally confirmed earlier by Pope Clement XI.
- 1740 – Pope Benedict XIV, previously known as Prospero Lambertini, succeeds Clement XII as the 247th Pope.
- 1784 – Classical composer Luigi Boccherini receives a pay rise of 12,000 reals from his employer, the Infante Luis, Count of Chinchón.
- 1798 – The Vietnamese Catholics report a Marian apparition in Quảng Trị, an event which is called Our Lady of La Vang.
- 1807 – Robert Fulton's North River Steamboat leaves New York City for Albany, New York, on the Hudson River, inaugurating the first commercial steamboat service in the world.
- 1808 – The Finnish War: The Battle of Alavus is fought.
- 1827 – Dutch King William I and Pope Leo XII sign concord.
- 1836 – British parliament accepts registration of births, marriages and deaths.
- 1862 – American Indian Wars: The Dakota War of 1862 begins in Minnesota as Dakota warriors attack white settlements along the Minnesota River.
- 1862 – American Civil War: Major General J. E. B. Stuart is assigned command of all the cavalry of the Confederate Army of Northern Virginia.
- 1863 – American Civil War: In Charleston, South Carolina, Union batteries and ships bombard Confederate-held Fort Sumter.
- 1864 – American Civil War: Battle of Gainesville: Confederate forces defeat Union troops near Gainesville, Florida.
- 1866 – The Grand Duchy of Baden announces its withdrawal from the German Confederation and signs a treaty of peace and alliance with Prussia.
- 1876 – Richard Wagner's Götterdämmerung, the last opera in his Ring cycle, premieres at the Bayreuth Festspielhaus.
- 1883 – The first public performance of the Dominican Republic's national anthem, Himno Nacional.
- 1896 – Bridget Driscoll becomes the first recorded case of a pedestrian killed in a collision with a motor car in the United Kingdom.

=== 1901–present ===
- 1907 – Pike Place Market, one of the oldest continuously operated public farmers' markets in the U.S. and a popular tourist attraction, opens in Seattle, Washington.
- 1914 – World War I: Battle of Stallupönen: The German army of General Hermann von François defeats the Russian force commanded by Paul von Rennenkampf near modern-day Nesterov, Russia.
- 1915 – Jewish American Leo Frank is lynched in Marietta, Georgia, USA after his death sentence is commuted by Governor John M. Slaton.
- 1915 – A Category 4 hurricane hits Galveston, Texas with winds at 135 miles per hour (217 km/h).
- 1916 – World War I: Romania signs a secret treaty with the Entente Powers. According to the treaty, Romania agreed to join the war on the Allied side.
- 1918 – Bolshevik revolutionary leader Moisei Uritsky is assassinated.
- 1942 – World War II: U.S. Marines raid the Japanese-held Pacific island of Makin.
- 1943 – World War II: The U.S. Eighth Air Force suffers the loss of 60 bombers on the Schweinfurt–Regensburg mission.
- 1943 – World War II: The U.S. Seventh Army under General George S. Patton arrives in Messina, Italy, followed several hours later by the British 8th Army under Field Marshal Bernard Montgomery, thus completing the Allied conquest of Sicily.
- 1943 – World War II: First Québec Conference of Winston Churchill, Franklin D. Roosevelt, and William Lyon Mackenzie King begins.
- 1943 – World War II: The Royal Air Force begins Operation Hydra, the first air raid of the Operation Crossbow strategic bombing campaign against Germany's V-weapon program.
- 1945 – Sukarno and Mohammad Hatta proclaim the independence of Indonesia, igniting the Indonesian National Revolution against the Dutch Empire.
- 1945 – The novella Animal Farm by George Orwell is first published.
- 1945 – Evacuation of Manchukuo: At Talitzou by the Sino-Korean border, Puyi, then the Kangde Emperor of Manchukuo, formally renounces the imperial throne, dissolves the state, and cedes its territory to the Republic of China.
- 1947 – The Radcliffe Line, the border between the Dominions of India and Pakistan, is revealed.
- 1949 – The 6.7 M_{s} Karlıova earthquake shakes eastern Turkey with a maximum Mercalli intensity of X (Extreme), leaving 320–450 dead.
- 1949 – Matsukawa derailment: Unknown saboteurs cause a passenger train to derail and overturn in Fukushima Prefecture, Japan, killing three crew members and igniting a political firestorm between the Japanese Communist Party and the government of Occupied Japan that will eventually lead to the Japanese Red Purge.
- 1950 – Korean War: Forty-two American prisoners of war are massacred by the Korean People's Army on a hill above Waegwan, South Korea.
- 1953 – First meeting of Narcotics Anonymous takes place, in Southern California.
- 1955 – Hurricane Diane makes landfall near Wilmington, North Carolina; it went on to cause major floods and kill more than 184 people.
- 1958 – Pioneer 0, America's first attempt at lunar orbit, is launched using the first Thor-Able rocket and fails. Notable as one of the first attempted launches beyond Earth orbit by any country.
- 1959 – Quake Lake is formed by the magnitude 7.2 1959 Hebgen Lake earthquake near Hebgen Lake in Montana.
- 1960 – Aeroflot Flight 036 crashes in Soviet Ukraine, killing 34.
- 1962 – Peter Fechter is shot and bleeds to death while trying to cross the new Berlin Wall.
- 1969 – Category 5 Hurricane Camille hits the U.S. Gulf Coast, killing 256 and causing $1.42 billion in damage.
- 1970 – Soviet Union Venera program: Venera 7 launched. It will become the first spacecraft to successfully transmit data from the surface of another planet (Venus).
- 1976 – A magnitude 7.9 earthquake hits off the coast of Mindanao, Philippines, triggering a destructive tsunami, killing between 5,000 and 8,000 people and leaving more than 90,000 homeless.
- 1977 – The Soviet icebreaker Arktika becomes the first surface ship to reach the North Pole.
- 1978 – Double Eagle II becomes first balloon to cross the Atlantic Ocean when it lands in Miserey, France near Paris, 137 hours after leaving Presque Isle, Maine.
- 1985 – The 1985–86 Hormel strike begins in Austin, Minnesota.
- 1988 – President of Pakistan Muhammad Zia-ul-Haq and U.S. Ambassador Arnold Raphel are killed in a plane crash.
- 1991 – Strathfield massacre: In Sydney, New South Wales, Australia, taxi driver Wade Frankum shoots and kills seven people and injures six others before turning the gun on himself.
- 1998 – Lewinsky scandal: US President Bill Clinton admits in taped testimony that he had an "improper physical relationship" with White House intern Monica Lewinsky; later that same day he admits before the nation that he "misled people" about the relationship.
- 1999 – The 7.6 M_{w} İzmit earthquake shakes northwestern Turkey with a maximum Mercalli intensity of IX (Violent), leaving 17,118–17,127 dead and 43,953–50,000 injured.
- 2004 – The National Assembly of Serbia unanimously adopts new state symbols for Serbia: Bože pravde becomes the new anthem and the coat of arms is adopted for the whole country.
- 2005 – The first forced evacuation of settlers, as part of Israeli disengagement from Gaza, starts.
- 2005 – Over 500 bombs are set off by terrorists at 300 locations in 63 out of the 64 districts of Bangladesh.
- 2008 – American swimmer Michael Phelps becomes the first person to win eight gold medals at one Olympic Games.
- 2009 – An accident at the Sayano-Shushenskaya Dam in Khakassia, Russia, kills 75 and shuts down the hydroelectric power station, leading to widespread power failure in the local area.
- 2015 – A bomb explodes near the Erawan Shrine in Bangkok, Thailand, killing at least 19 people and injuring 123 others.
- 2017 – Barcelona attacks: A van is driven into pedestrians in La Rambla, killing 14 and injuring at least 100.
- 2019 – A bomb explodes at a wedding in Kabul killing 63 people and leaving 182 injured.

== Births ==
=== Pre-1600 ===
- 1465 – Philibert I, Duke of Savoy (died 1482)
- 1473 – Richard of Shrewsbury, Duke of York (died 1483)
- 1501 – Philipp II, Count of Hanau-Münzenberg (died 1529)
- 1556 – Alexander Briant, English martyr and saint (died 1581)
- 1578 – Francesco Albani, Italian painter (died 1660)
- 1578 – Johann, Prince of Hohenzollern-Sigmaringen, first prince of Hohenzollern-Sigmaringen (died 1638)
- 1582 – John Matthew Rispoli, Maltese philosopher (died 1639)
- 1586 – Johann Valentin Andrea, German theologian (died 1654)

=== 1601–1900 ===
- 1603 – Lennart Torstensson, Swedish Field Marshal, Privy Councillour and Governor-General (died 1651)
- 1629 – John III Sobieski, Polish–Lithuanian king (died 1696)
- 1686 – Nicola Porpora, Italian composer and educator (died 1768)
- 1753 – Josef Dobrovský, Bohemian philologist and historian (died 1828)
- 1768 – Louis Desaix, French general (died 1800)
- 1786 – Davy Crockett, American soldier and politician (died 1836)
- 1786 – Princess Victoria of Saxe-Coburg-Saalfeld (died 1861)
- 1801 – Fredrika Bremer, Swedish writer and feminist (died 1865)
- 1828 – Jules Bernard Luys, French neurologist and physician (died 1897)
- 1840 – Wilfrid Scawen Blunt, English poet and activist (died 1922)
- 1845 – Henry Cadwalader Chapman, American physician and naturalist (died 1909)
- 1849 – William Kidston, Scottish-Australian politician, 17th Premier of Queensland (died 1919)
- 1863 – Gene Stratton-Porter, American author and photographer (died 1924)
- 1865 – Julia Marlowe, English-American actress (died 1950)
- 1866 – Mahbub Ali Khan, Asaf Jah VI, Indian 6th Nizam of Hyderabad (died 1911)
- 1873 – John A. Sampson, American gynecologist and academic (died 1946)
- 1877 – Ralph McKittrick, American golfer and tennis player (died 1923)
- 1878 – Reggie Duff, Australian cricketer (died 1911)
- 1880 – Percy Sherwell, South African cricketer and tennis player (died 1948)
- 1885 – Ernest Dezentjé, Dutch-Indonesian painter (died 1972)
- 1887 – Charles I of Austria (died 1922)
- 1887 – Marcus Garvey, Jamaican journalist and activist, founded Black Star Line (died 1940)
- 1888 – Monty Woolley, American actor, raconteur, and pundit (died 1963)
- 1888 – Pieter van der Hoog, Dutch bacteriologist, dermatologist, and Islamicist (died 1957)
- 1889 – Lalla Carlsen, Norwegian singer and actress (died 1967)
- 1890 – Stefan Bastyr, Polish soldier and pilot (died 1920)
- 1890 – Harry Hopkins, American politician and diplomat, 8th United States Secretary of Commerce (died 1946)
- 1893 – John Brahm, German-American director and production manager (died 1982)
- 1893 – Mae West, American stage and film actress (died 1980)
- 1894 – William Rootes, 1st Baron Rootes, English businessman, founded Rootes Group (died 1964)
- 1896 – Leslie Groves, American general and engineer, head of the Manhattan Project (died 1970)
- 1896 – Tõnis Kint, Estonian lieutenant and politician, Prime Minister of Estonia in exile (died 1991)
- 1896 – Oliver Waterman Larkin, American historian and author (died 1970)
- 1899 – Janet Lewis, American poet and novelist (died 1998)
- 1900 – Vivienne de Watteville, British travel writer and adventurer (died 1957)
- 1900 – Pauline A. Young, American teacher, historian, aviator and activist (died 1991)

=== 1901–present ===
- 1904 – Mary Cain, American journalist and politician (died 1984)
- 1904 – Leopold Nowak, Austrian composer and musicologist (died 1991)
- 1909 – Larry Clinton, American trumpet player and bandleader (died 1985)
- 1909 – Wilf Copping, English footballer (died 1980)
- 1911 – Mikhail Botvinnik, Russian chess player and engineer (died 1995)
- 1911 – Martin Sandberger, German colonel and lawyer (died 2010)
- 1913 – Mark Felt, American lawyer and agent, 2nd Deputy Director of the Federal Bureau of Investigation (died 2008)
- 1913 – Oscar Alfredo Gálvez, Argentinian race car driver (died 1989)
- 1913 – Rudy York, American baseball player and manager (died 1970)
- 1914 – Bill Downs, American journalist (died 1978)
- 1914 – Franklin Delano Roosevelt Jr., American lawyer and politician (died 1988)
- 1916 – Moses Majekodunmi, Nigerian physician and politician (died 2012)
- 1918 – Evelyn Ankers, British-American actress (died 1985)
- 1918 – Ike Quebec, American saxophonist and pianist (died 1963)
- 1918 – Michael John Wise, English geographer and academic (died 2015)
- 1919 – Georgia Gibbs, American singer (died 2006)
- 1920 – Maureen O'Hara, Irish-American actress and singer (died 2015)
- 1920 – Lida Moser, American photographer and author (died 2014)
- 1921 – Geoffrey Elton, German-English historian and academic (died 1994)
- 1922 – Roy Tattersall, English cricketer (died 2011)
- 1923 – Carlos Cruz-Diez, Venezuelan artist (died 2019)
- 1923 – Larry Rivers, American painter and sculptor (died 2002)
- 1924 – Evan S. Connell, American novelist, poet, and short story writer (died 2013)
- 1926 – Valerie Eliot, English businesswoman (died 2012)
- 1926 – Jiang Zemin, Chinese engineer and politician, former General Secretary of the Chinese Communist Party (paramount leader) and President of China (died 2022)
- 1927 – Sam Butera, American saxophonist and bandleader (died 2009)
- 1927 – F. Ray Keyser Jr., American lawyer and politician, Governor of Vermont (died 2015)
- 1928 – T. J. Anderson, American composer, conductor, and educator
- 1928 – Willem Duys, Dutch tennis player, sportscaster, and producer (died 2011)
- 1929 – Francis Gary Powers, American captain and pilot (died 1977)
- 1930 – Harve Bennett, American screenwriter and producer (died 2015)
- 1930 – Ted Hughes, English poet and playwright (died 1998)
- 1931 – Tony Wrigley, English historian, demographer, and academic (died 2022)
- 1932 – V. S. Naipaul, Trinidadian-English novelist and essayist, Nobel Prize laureate (died 2018)
- 1932 – Duke Pearson, American pianist and composer (died 1980)
- 1932 – Jean-Jacques Sempé, French cartoonist (died 2022)
- 1933 – Mark Dinning, American pop singer (died 1986)
- 1934 – João Donato, Brazilian pianist and composer (died 2023)
- 1934 – Ron Henry, English footballer (died 2014)
- 1936 – Seamus Mallon, Irish educator and politician, Deputy First Minister of Northern Ireland (died 2020)
- 1936 – Margaret Heafield Hamilton, American computer scientist, systems engineer, and business owner (died 2026)
- 1938 – Theodoros Pangalos, Greek lawyer and politician, Deputy Prime Minister of Greece (died 2023)
- 1939 – Luther Allison, American blues guitarist and singer (died 1997)
- 1939 – Cleve Moler, American mathematician, creator of the MATLAB interface (died 2026)
- 1940 – Eduardo Mignogna, Argentinian director and screenwriter (died 2006)
- 1940 – Barry Sheerman, English academic and politician
- 1941 – Lothar Bisky, German businessman and politician (died 2013)
- 1941 – Jean Pierre Lefebvre, Canadian director and screenwriter
- 1941 – Boog Powell, American baseball player
- 1942 – Shane Porteous, Australian actor, animator, and screenwriter
- 1943 – Edward Cowie, English composer, painter, and author
- 1943 – Robert De Niro, American actor, entrepreneur, director, and producer
- 1943 – John Humphrys, Welsh journalist and author
- 1943 – Dave "Snaker" Ray, American singer-songwriter and guitarist (died 2002)
- 1944 – Larry Ellison, American businessman, co-founded the Oracle Corporation
- 1944 – Jean-Bernard Pommier, French pianist and conductor (died 2026)
- 1945 – Rachel Pollack, American author, poet, and educator (died 2023)
- 1946 – Hugh Baiocchi, South African golfer
- 1946 – Martha Coolidge, American director, producer, and screenwriter
- 1946 – Patrick Manning, Trinidadian-Tobagonian politician, 4th Prime Minister of Trinidad and Tobago (died 2016)
- 1947 – Mohamed Abdelaziz, Sahrawi politician, President of the Sahrawi Arab Democratic Republic (died 2016)
- 1947 – Gary Talley, American guitarist, singer-songwriter, and author
- 1948 – Alexander Ivashkin, Russian-English cellist and conductor (died 2014)
- 1949 – Norm Coleman, American lawyer and politician, 52nd Mayor of St. Paul
- 1949 – Sue Draheim, American fiddler and composer (died 2013)
- 1949 – Julian Fellowes, English actor, director, screenwriter, and politician
- 1949 – Sib Hashian, American rock drummer (died 2017)
- 1950 – Geraint Jarman, Welsh musician, poet and television producer (died 2025)
- 1951 – Richard Hunt, American Muppet performer (died 1992)
- 1951 – Robert Joy, Canadian actor
- 1952 – Aleksandr Maksimenkov, Russian footballer and coach (died 2012)
- 1952 – Nelson Piquet, Brazilian race car driver and businessman
- 1952 – Mario Theissen, German engineer and businessman
- 1952 – Guillermo Vilas, Argentinian tennis player
- 1953 – Mick Malthouse, Australian footballer and coach
- 1953 – Herta Müller, Romanian-German poet and author, Nobel Prize laureate
- 1953 – Korrie Layun Rampan, Indonesian author, poet, and critic (died 2015)
- 1953 – Kevin Rowland, English singer-songwriter and guitarist
- 1953 – Robert Thirsk, Canadian astronaut (STS 78)
- 1954 – Eric Johnson, American singer-songwriter, guitarist, and producer
- 1954 – Andrés Pastrana Arango, Colombian lawyer and politician, 38th President of Colombia
- 1955 – Colin Moulding, English singer-songwriter and bassist
- 1956 – Gail Berman, American businessman, co-founded BermanBraun
- 1956 – Álvaro Pino, Spanish cyclist
- 1957 – Ken Kwapis, American director and screenwriter
- 1957 – Laurence Overmire, American poet, author, and actor
- 1957 – Robin Cousins, British competitive figure skater
- 1958 – Belinda Carlisle, American singer-songwriter
- 1958 – Fred Goodwin, Scottish banker and accountant
- 1958 – Maurizio Sandro Sala, Brazilian race car driver
- 1959 – Jonathan Franzen, American novelist and essayist
- 1959 – Jacek Kazimierski, Polish footballer
- 1959 – Eric Schlosser, American journalist and author
- 1959 – David Koresh, American cult leader (died 1993)
- 1960 – Stephan Eicher, Swiss singer-songwriter
- 1960 – Sean Penn, American actor, director, and political activist
- 1962 – Gilby Clarke, American singer-songwriter, guitarist, and producer
- 1962 – Dan Dakich, American basketball player, coach, and sportscaster
- 1963 – Jon Gruden, American football player, coach, and sportscaster
- 1963 – Jackie Walorski, American politician (died 2022)
- 1964 – Colin James, Canadian singer-songwriter, guitarist, and producer
- 1964 – Maria McKee, American singer-songwriter
- 1964 – Dave Penney, English footballer and manager
- 1965 – Steve Gorman, American drummer
- 1965 – Dottie Pepper, American golfer
- 1966 – Jüri Luik, Estonian politician and diplomat, 18th Estonian Minister of Defense
- 1966 – Rodney Mullen, American skateboarder and stuntman
- 1966 – Don Sweeney, Canadian ice hockey player and manager
- 1967 – David Conrad, American actor
- 1967 – Michael Preetz, German footballer and manager
- 1968 – Andriy Kuzmenko, Ukrainian singer-songwriter (died 2015)
- 1968 – Ed McCaffrey, American football player and sportscaster
- 1968 – Helen McCrory, English actress (died 2021)
- 1969 – Christian Laettner, American basketball player and coach
- 1969 – Kelvin Mercer, American rapper, songwriter and producer
- 1969 – Donnie Wahlberg, American singer-songwriter, actor and producer
- 1970 – Jim Courier, American tennis player and sportscaster
- 1970 – Andrus Kivirähk, Estonian author
- 1970 – Øyvind Leonhardsen, Norwegian footballer and coach
- 1971 – Uhm Jung-hwa, South Korean singer and actress
- 1971 – Jorge Posada, Puerto Rican-American baseball player
- 1971 – Shaun Rehn, Australian footballer and coach
- 1972 – Habibul Bashar, Bangladeshi cricketer
- 1974 – Giuliana Rancic, Italian-American journalist and television personality
- 1974 – Johannes Maria Staud, Austrian composer
- 1976 – Eric Boulton, Canadian ice hockey player
- 1976 – Geertjan Lassche, Dutch journalist and director
- 1976 – Serhiy Zakarlyuka, Ukrainian footballer and manager (died 2014)
- 1977 – Nathan Deakes, Australian race walker
- 1977 – William Gallas, French footballer
- 1977 – Thierry Henry, French footballer
- 1977 – Mike Lewis, Welsh guitarist
- 1977 – Tarja Turunen, Finnish singer-songwriter and producer
- 1979 – Antwaan Randle El, American football player and journalist
- 1979 – Nicole Sunitsch, Austrian politician
- 1980 – Keith Dabengwa, Zimbabwean cricketer
- 1980 – Daniel Güiza, Spanish footballer
- 1980 – Jan Kromkamp, Dutch footballer
- 1980 – Lene Marlin, Norwegian singer-songwriter
- 1982 – Phil Jagielka, English footballer
- 1982 – Cheerleader Melissa, American wrestler and manager
- 1982 – Mark Salling, American actor and musician (died 2018)
- 1983 – Dustin Pedroia, American baseball player
- 1984 – Dee Brown, American basketball player
- 1984 – Oksana Domnina, Russian ice dancer
- 1984 – Liam Heath, British sprint canoeist
- 1984 – Garrett Wolfe, American football player
- 1985 – Yū Aoi, Japanese actress and model
- 1986 – Rudy Gay, American basketball player
- 1986 – Tyrus Thomas, American basketball player
- 1988 – Brady Corbet, American actor and director
- 1988 – Jihadi John, Kuwaiti-British member of ISIS (died 2015)
- 1988 – Joyner Lucas, American rapper
- 1988 – Natalie Sandtorv, Norwegian singer-songwriter
- 1988 – Erika Toda, Japanese actress
- 1989 – Lil B, American rapper
- 1989 – Rachel Corsie, Scottish footballer
- 1990 – Rachel Hurd-Wood, English actress
- 1991 – Austin Butler, American actor
- 1992 – Saraya Bevis, English wrestler
- 1992 – Alex Elisala, New Zealand-Australian rugby player (died 2013)
- 1992 – Chanel Mata'utia, Australian rugby league player
- 1992 – Maru Teferi, Israeli marathon runner
- 1993 – Kevin Byard, American football player
- 1993 – Ederson Moraes, Brazilian footballer
- 1993 – Sarah Sjöström, Swedish swimmer
- 1993 – Xie Zhenye, Chinese athlete
- 1994 – Phoebe Bridgers, American singer/songwriter
- 1994 – Jack Conklin, American football player
- 1994 – Taissa Farmiga, American actress
- 1995 – Gracie Gold, American figure skater
- 1995 – Dallin Watene-Zelezniak, New Zealand rugby league player
- 1996 – Jake Virtanen, Canadian ice hockey player
- 1998 – Yoshinobu Yamamoto, Japanese baseball player
- 2000 – Lil Pump, American rapper and songwriter
- 2003 – Rayan Cherki, French footballer
- 2003 – Nastasja Schunk, German tennis player
- 2003 – The Kid Laroi, Australian rapper and songwriter

== Deaths ==
=== Pre-1600 ===
- 754 – Carloman, mayor of the palace of Austrasia
- 949 – Li Shouzhen, Chinese general and governor
- 1153 – Eustace IV, Count of Boulogne (born 1130)
- 1304 – Emperor Go-Fukakusa of Japan (born 1243)
- 1324 – Irene of Brunswick (born 1293)
- 1338 – Nitta Yoshisada, Japanese samurai (born 1301)
- 1424 – John Stewart, Earl of Buchan (born c. 1381)
- 1510 – Edmund Dudley, English politician, Speaker of the House of Commons (born 1462)
- 1510 – Richard Empson, English statesman
- 1547 – Katharina von Zimmern, Swiss sovereign abbess (born 1478)

=== 1601–1900 ===
- 1673 – Regnier de Graaf, Dutch physician and anatomist (born 1641)
- 1676 – Hans Jakob Christoffel von Grimmelshausen, German author (born 1621)
- 1720 – Anne Dacier, French scholar and translator (born 1654)
- 1723 – Joseph Bingham, English scholar and academic (born 1668)
- 1768 – Vasily Trediakovsky, Russian poet and playwright (born 1703)
- 1785 – Jonathan Trumbull, English-American merchant and politician, 16th Governor of Connecticut (born 1710)
- 1786 – Frederick the Great, Prussian king (born 1712)
- 1809 – Matthew Boulton, English businessman and engineer, co-founded Boulton and Watt (born 1728)
- 1814 – John Johnson, English architect and surveyor (born 1732)
- 1834 – Husein Gradaščević, Ottoman general (born 1802)
- 1838 – Lorenzo Da Ponte, Italian playwright and poet (born 1749)
- 1850 – José de San Martín, Argentinian general and politician, 1st President of Peru (born 1778)
- 1861 – Alcée Louis la Branche, American politician and diplomat, 1st United States Ambassador to Texas (born 1806)
- 1870 – Perucho Figueredo, Cuban poet and activist (born 1818)
- 1875 – Wilhelm Bleek, German linguist and anthropologist (born 1827)
- 1897 – William Jervois, English engineer and diplomat, 10th Governor of South Australia (born 1821)

=== 1901–present ===
- 1901 – Edmond Audran, French organist and composer (born 1842)
- 1903 – Hans Gude, Norwegian-German painter and academic (born 1825)
- 1908 – Radoje Domanović, Serbian satirist and journalist (born 1873)
- 1909 – Madan Lal Dhingra, Indian activist (born 1883)
- 1918 – Moisei Uritsky, Russian activist and politician (born 1873)
- 1920 – Ray Chapman, American baseball player (born 1891)
- 1924 – Tom Kendall, English-Australian cricketer and journalist (born 1851)
- 1925 – Ioan Slavici, Romanian journalist and author (born 1848)
- 1935 – Adam Gunn, American decathlete (born 1872)
- 1935 – Charlotte Perkins Gilman, American sociologist and author (born 1860)
- 1936 – José María of Manila, Spanish-Filipino priest and martyr (born 1880)
- 1940 – Billy Fiske, American soldier and pilot (born 1911)
- 1945 – Reidar Haaland, Norwegian police officer and soldier (born 1919)
- 1949 – Gregorio Perfecto, Filipino journalist, jurist, and politician (born 1891)
- 1958 – Arthur Fox, English-American fencer (born 1878)
- 1966 – Ken Miles, English race car driver and engineer (born 1918)
- 1969 – Otto Stern, German physicist and academic, Nobel Prize laureate (born 1888)
- 1970 – Rattana Pestonji, Thai director and producer (born 1908)
- 1971 – Maedayama Eigorō, Japanese sumo wrestler, the 39th Yokozuna (born 1914)
- 1971 – Wilhelm List, German field marshal (born 1880)
- 1973 – Conrad Aiken, American novelist, short story writer, critic, and poet (born 1889)
- 1973 – Jean Barraqué, French pianist and composer (born 1928)
- 1973 – Paul Williams, American singer and choreographer (born 1939)
- 1977 – Delmer Daves, American screenwriter, director and producer (born 1904)
- 1979 – John C. Allen, American roller coaster designer (born 1907)
- 1979 – Vivian Vance, American actress and singer (born 1909)
- 1983 – Ira Gershwin, American songwriter (born 1896)
- 1987 – Gary Chester, Italian drummer and educator (born 1924)
- 1987 – Rudolf Hess, German soldier and politician, convicted Nuremberg war criminal (born 1894)
- 1987 – Shaike Ophir, Israeli actor and screenwriter (born 1929)
- 1988 – Muhammad Zia-ul-Haq, Pakistani general and politician, 6th President of Pakistan (born 1924)
- 1988 – Franklin Delano Roosevelt Jr., American lawyer and politician (born 1914)
- 1988 – Victoria Shaw, Australian actress (born 1935)
- 1990 – Pearl Bailey, American actress and singer (born 1918)
- 1993 – Feng Kang, Chinese mathematician and academic (born 1920)
- 1994 – Luigi Chinetti, Italian-American race car driver and businessman (born 1901)
- 1994 – Jack Morrison, Australian rugby league player (born 1905)
- 1994 – Jack Sharkey, American boxer and referee (born 1902)
- 1995 – Howard E. Koch, American playwright and screenwriter (born 1902)
- 1995 – Ted Whitten, Australian footballer and coach (born 1933)
- 1998 – Władysław Komar, Polish shot putter and actor (born 1940)
- 1998 – Tadeusz Ślusarski, Polish pole vaulter (born 1950)
- 2000 – Jack Walker, English businessman (born 1929)
- 2004 – Thea Astley, Australian author and educator (born 1925)
- 2005 – John N. Bahcall, American astrophysicist and academic (born 1934)
- 2006 – Shamsur Rahman, Bangladeshi poet and journalist (born 1929)
- 2007 – Bill Deedes, English journalist and politician (born 1913)
- 2007 – Eddie Griffin, American basketball player (born 1982)
- 2008 – Franco Sensi, Italian businessman and politician (born 1926)
- 2010 – Francesco Cossiga, Italian lawyer and politician, 8th President of Italy (born 1928)
- 2012 – Aase Bjerkholt, Norwegian politician, Minister of Children, Equality and Social Inclusion (born 1915)
- 2012 – Victor Poor, American engineer, developed the Datapoint 2200 (born 1933)
- 2012 – Patrick Ricard, French businessman (born 1945)
- 2012 – John Lynch-Staunton, Canadian lawyer and politician (born 1930)
- 2013 – Odilia Dank, American educator and politician (born 1938)
- 2013 – Jack Harshman, American baseball player (born 1927)
- 2013 – John Hollander, American poet and critic (born 1929)
- 2013 – David Landes, Jewish-American historian and economist (born 1924)
- 2013 – Frank Martínez, American painter (born 1924)
- 2013 – Gus Winckel, Dutch lieutenant and pilot (born 1912)
- 2014 – Børre Knudsen, Norwegian minister and activist (born 1937)
- 2014 – Wolfgang Leonhard, German historian and author (born 1921)
- 2014 – Sophie Masloff, American civil servant and politician, 56th Mayor of Pittsburgh (born 1917)
- 2014 – Miodrag Pavlović, Serbian poet and critic (born 1928)
- 2014 – Pierre Vassiliu, French singer-songwriter (born 1937)
- 2015 – Yvonne Craig, American ballet dancer and actress (born 1937)
- 2015 – Gerhard Mayer-Vorfelder, German businessman (born 1933)
- 2015 – László Paskai, Hungarian cardinal (born 1927)
- 2016 – Arthur Hiller, Canadian actor, director, and producer (born 1923)
- 2024 – Virginia Ogilvy, Countess of Airlie, British countess (born 1933)
- 2024 – Silvio Santos, Brazilian media mogul and television host (born 1930)
- 2025 – Terence Stamp, English actor (born 1938)

== Holidays and observances ==
- Christian feast day:
  - Saint Beatrice of Silva
  - Saint Clare of Montefalco
  - Elias of Enna
  - Saint Hyacinth of Poland
  - Jacobo Kyushei Tomonaga
  - Saint Jeanne Delanoue
  - Saint Mammes of Caesarea
  - Samuel Johnson, Timothy Cutler, and Thomas Bradbury Chandler (Episcopal Church)
  - August 17 (Eastern Orthodox liturgics)
- Engineer's Day (Colombia)
- Independence Day, celebrates the independence proclamation of Indonesia from Japan in 1945.
