= Vlochos (archaeological site) =

Greek archeological site

- Βλοχός (Greek)
- Strongilovouni
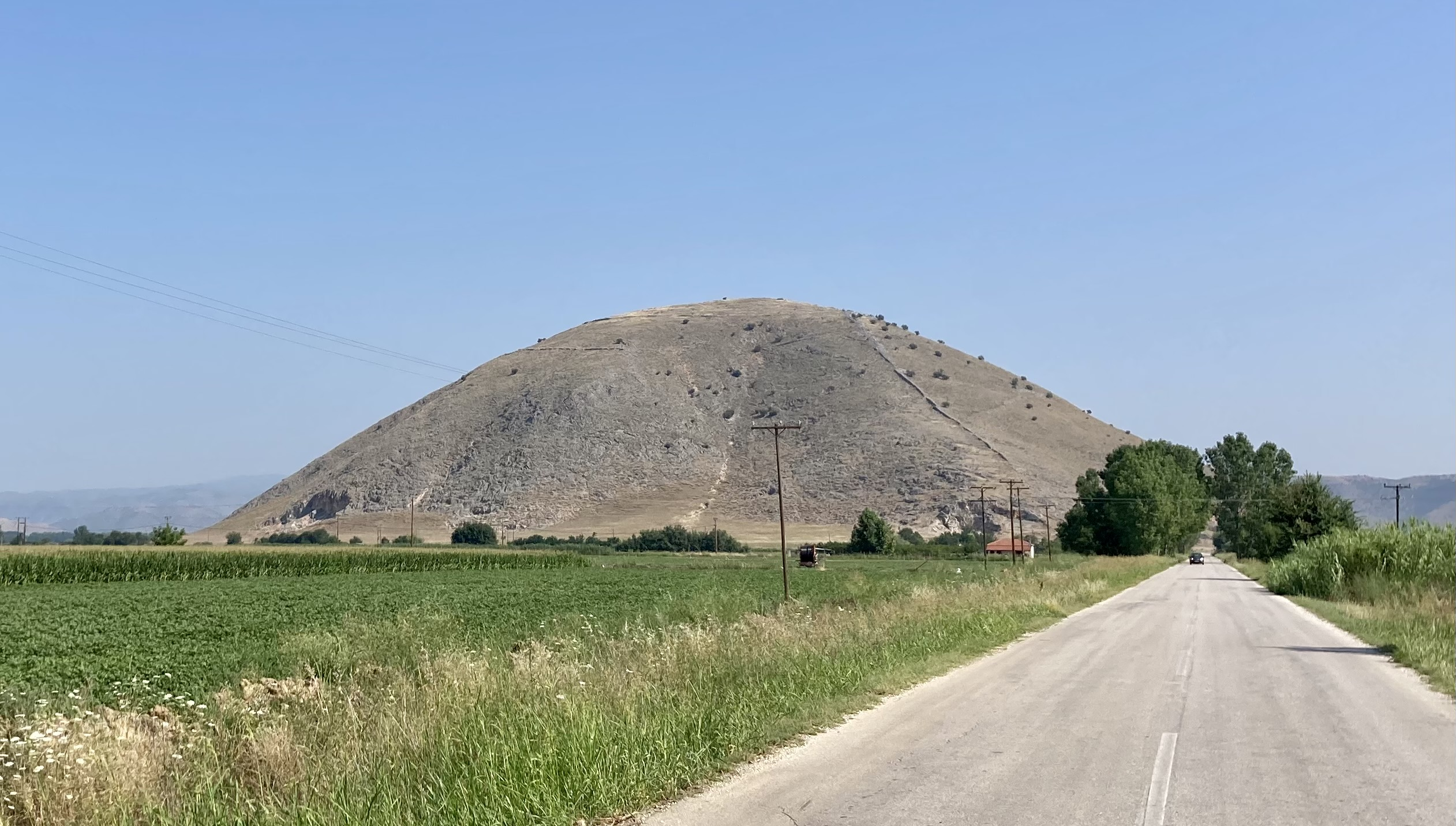
- The archaeological site and the hill of Strongilovouni, towards north.

- Location within Greece
- 39°30′19″N 22°05′10″E
- Type: Ancient city, hillfort
- Cultures: Ancient Greece
- Location: Vlochos, Palamas
- Region: Karditsa, Thessaly, Greece
- Part of: Ancient Thessaliotis

History
- Built: Late Archaic period
- Abandoned: Early Byzantine period

Site notes
- Archaeologists: Angelos Liangouras, Jean-Claude Decourt, Elsa Nikolaou, Leonidas Hatziangelakis, Maria Vaiopoulou, Fotini Tsiouka, Robin Rönnlund, Derek Pitman, Johan Klange
- Website: www.culture.gov.gr/el/Information/SitePages/view.aspx?nID=1761

The archaeological site at Vlochos (Greek: Βλοχός [vloˈxos]) is located at the northeast corner of the western Thessalian plain, in the regional unit of Karditsa, Greece. The site is centred around the large hill of Strongilovouni (Greek: Στρογγυλοβούνι) south of the modern village, and contains the remains of several urban settlements of Classical Antiquity. The remains cannot be securely identified with any city known from ancient sources, but the size of the settlement indicates that it must have been one of the poleis or city-states of the region.

== Identification of the ancient remains ==
None of the ancient inscriptions found at Vlochos mention the name of the ancient settlement, and the identification of the ancient remains with cities known from ancient literary sources are consequently conjectural. Until recently, the most common identification was with the ancient polis of Peirasia, but recent discoveries has firmly established that Peirasia was at modern Ermitsi (10 km south of Vlochos).

At present, there are two main candidates for the ancient settlement, Limnaion and Phakion (Ancient Greek: Φάκιον); both known from ancient sources. There are further ancient sites in the area of Thessaliotis, however, that have only conjecturally been identified with an ancient polis (including Pelinna and Pharkadon), highlighting the gaps in the knowledge of this ancient region.

== Geography ==
The archaeological site at Vlochos is centred around the hill of Strongilovouni (313 metres above sea level), an isolated limestone feature at the northeast edge of the plain of Karditsa. The immediate surroundings are dominated by the confluences of several rivers, including that of Apidanos and Kouarios with the Enipeus, and the latter with the Peneios, the main river of Thessaly. Most of the area consists of former floodland, but is at present heavily cultivated. In the east, however, is an area of hills known as the Revenia, covered in low trees and pournaria.

The closest polis neighbours of the ancient city were Krannon to the east, Atrax to the northeast, Phayttos to the north, Pharkadon to the northwest,^{[a]} Methylion to the southwest, and Peirasia to the south. The area possibly belonged to the quarter or tetrad of Thessaliotis, a subdivision of ancient Thessaly which appears to have been centred along the basin of the Enipeus. The perimeters of the territory in north and west were protected by small forts at Keramidi and Metamorfosi.

== Archaeological work ==
The site of Vlochos was first mentioned by the British traveller William Leake, who passed through the region (albeit without visiting the remains) in 1803. The first to give a first-hand account of the ancient remains was the Danish scholar Johan Louis Ussing whose 1846 observations of the site remained the most detailed until the second half of the 20th century. It was long assumed that the ancient settlement was mainly located on the top of the Strongilovouni hill, but rescue excavations conducted in 1964 by the local archaeological authorities revealed that the urban environment was instead at the southern foot of the hill, in an area known as Patoma. Here, remains of what was interpreted as a sanctuary with several inscribed votive stelai were found, dating from the Classical and Hellenistic periods. A French survey of the Valley of Enipeus in the 1980s resulted in a more detailed description of the site, including its considerable and well-preserved fortifications.

Further rescue work in the 1990s at the foot of the hill revealed that the area contained many remains of Classical-Hellenistic habitation. A Greek-Swedish collaboration, the Vlochos Archaeological Project (VLAP), conducted a complete non-invasive survey of the archaeological site in 2016–2018, with participating researchers from the Ephorate of Antiquities of Karditsa, the Swedish Institute at Athens, the University of Gothenburg and Bournemouth University. A continuation of the 2016–2018 fieldwork, the Palamas Archaeological Project (2020–) is ongoing, aiming at conducting excavations at the site as well as examining the immediate surroundings of the ancient city. Some preliminary notes on the fieldwork conducted in 2020 have been published.

== Description of the ancient remains ==
The Greek-Swedish team of archaeologists examining the site in 2016–2018 identified four discrete phases of habitation at the site. The dates of these phases were proposed on stylistic grounds, as no excavation was carried out during the course of work. Stratigraphic relationships between the identified building programmes, however, provided the internal chronological order of the phases.

=== First phase (Late Archaic?) ===
The first identified traces of building activity at the site consist of a large fortified enclosure in rubble masonry on the hilltop. The fortification walls of this phase originally stretched for 1.5 km with a width of 2.7 m. The maximum preserved height of this wall is 2.5 m, but it probably had a considerable mud brick superstructure. No towers have been found, but two large gates provide access to the fortified space from the west and southeast.

Two terraced roads lead in zig-zag from the plains below to the aforementioned gates. These are 4–6 m wide, and are supported by large terraces, giving a monumental impression from the plains below. The roads ascend the slope in a constant angle of 12.3%, which together with their width indicates that they were used for transport of people and goods by horse and cart.

No surface material can be associated with this phase, but the layout of the fortifications suggests a pre-Classical date, possibly of the Mycenaean or more probably late Archaic period.

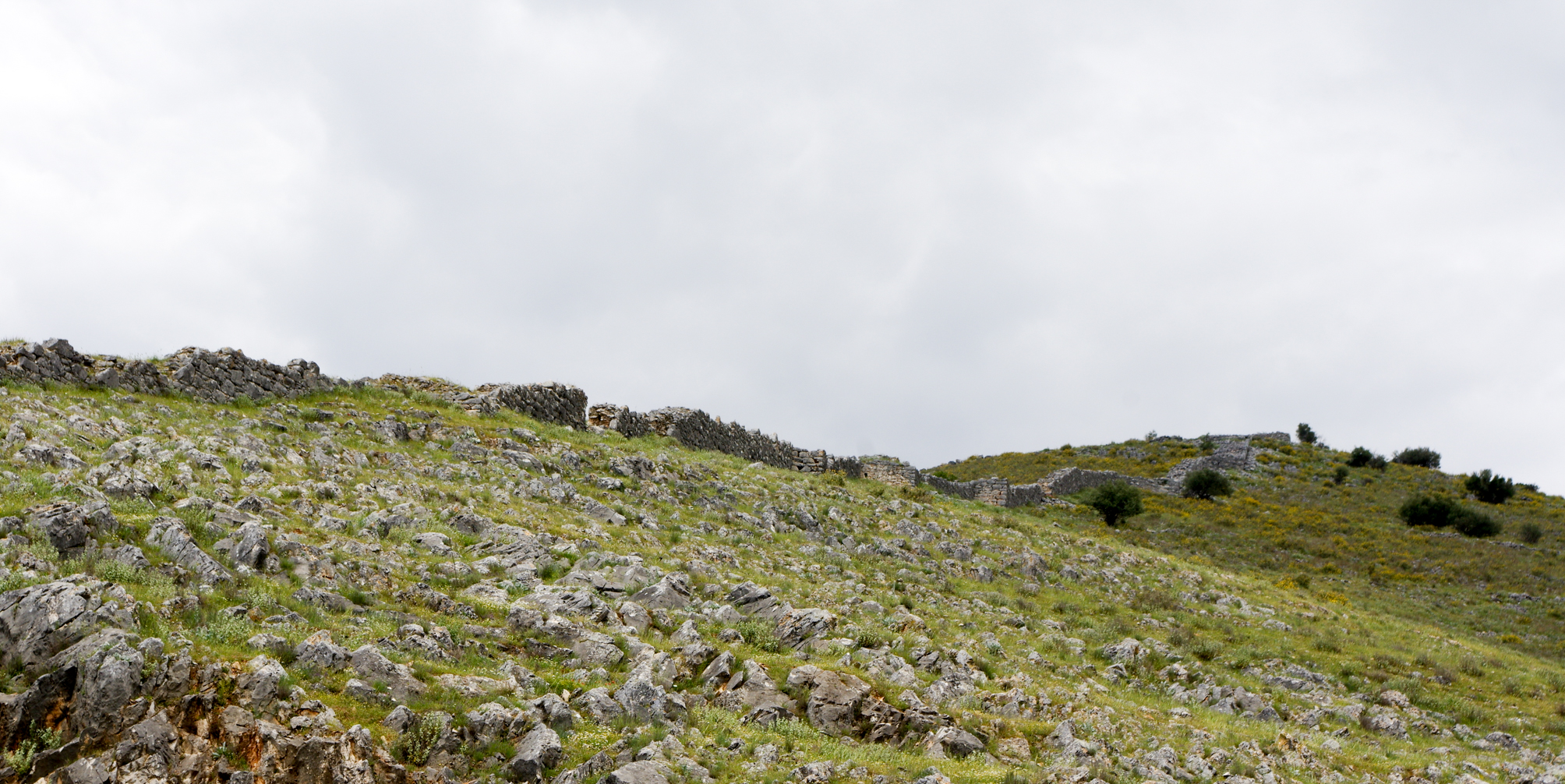
The Classical-Hellenistic fortification wall on the south-east slope of the hill, with extensive Early Byzantine repairs.

=== Second phase (Classical-Hellenistic) ===
The most extensive building phase at the site is divided in two sub-phases, both of which are stylistically dated to the 4th or 3rd century BC. The first of these is characterised by the construction of a large fortified enceinte, enclosing some of the hilltop, the slopes and the area of Patoma at the foot of the hill. Very little of the fortifications below the slopes remains today, due extensive later use of the site for building material. The geophysical prospection of 2016–2018, however, show that the fortification wall enclosed a 15 hectare space at the foot of the hill, with 35–40 large towers every 30 metres (one plethron). At least three gates have been identified in the southeast and southwest corner as well as in the centre of the southern side of the enclosure.

At some time following this, the second building sub-phase brought some configurations to this layout, as the enclosed hilltop area was extended further to the north, and reinforced with 18 square towers. By constructing a cross-wall or diateichisma in the south slope, a large separately fortified acropolis was created. This latter area appears to have contained few buildings; only one courtyard house of a probable Hellenistic date and some minor auxiliary buildings have been noted here.

The actual area of settlement was instead located in the flat area immediately below the hill. Here, geophysical prospection has revealed evidence for considerable buried remains of this phase, including a large avenue (plateia) leading along the slope with over 20 deviating side-streets (stenopoi). One, possibly two, agorai have been identified as well as clear indications of Classical-Hellenistic domestic architecture.

Remains of monumental architecture as well as inscriptions have been found in the debris left by an abandoned 20th century quarry in the settlement area, indicating the existence of a possible sanctuary.

=== Third phase (Late Roman) ===
The 2016–2018 geophysical survey of the settlement area revealed the extensive remains of a hitherto unknown separately walled enceinte with 16 discernible towers. Similarities with other sites in Mainland Greece, including Nicopolis, Plataea, and Tanagra, suggest that this phase of habitation belongs to the Roman period, possibly the late 200s AD. At this time, the Balkan Peninsula was ravaged by the Goths, leading to massive destruction in the eastern half of the Empire. This took place during the so-called Crisis of the Third Century, a time of unrest that only ended by the ascension of Diocletian in AD 284, and it is possible that the re-fortification of the location is related to this time of unrest.

=== Fourth phase (Early Byzantine) ===
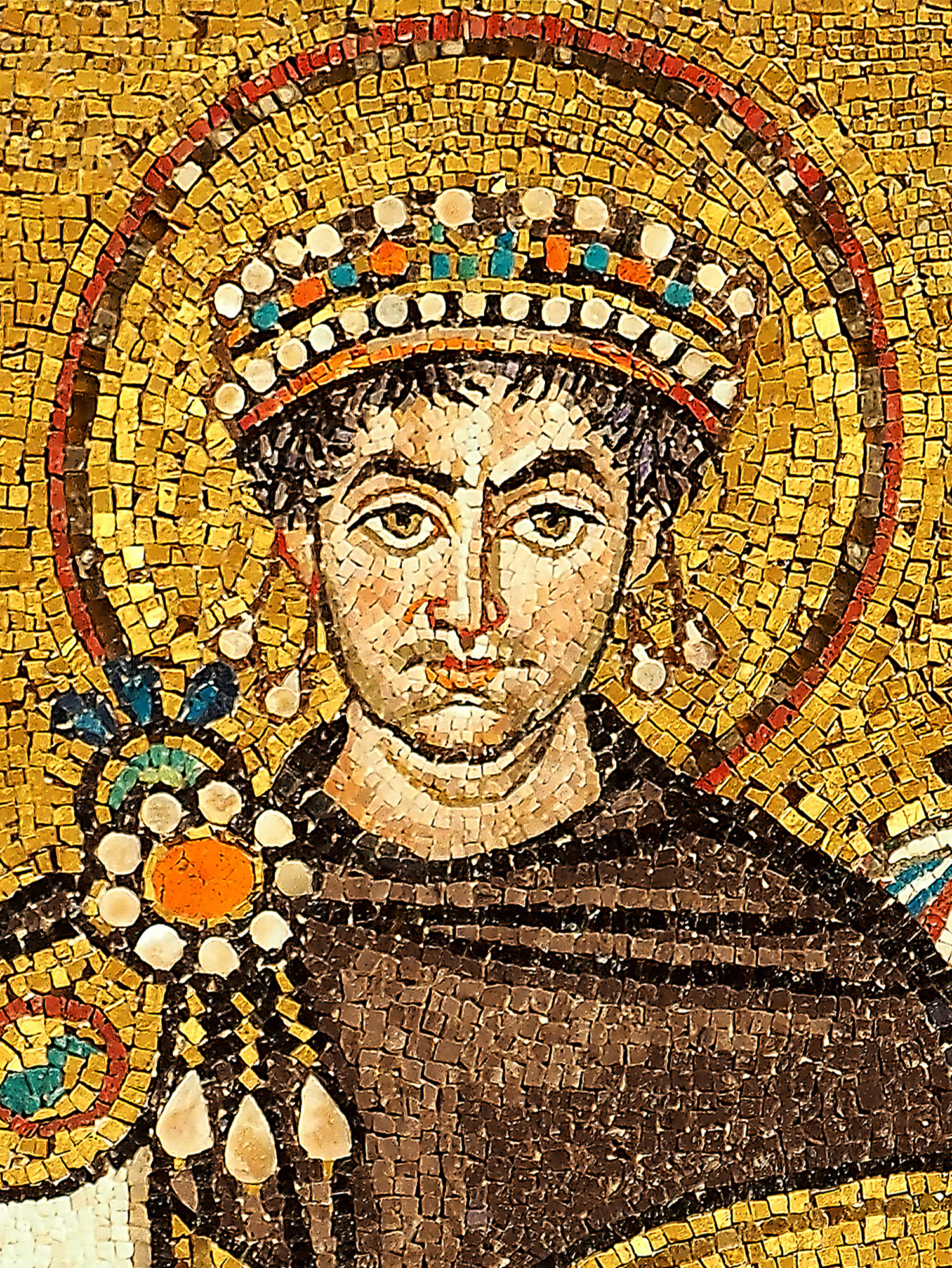
The Eastern Roman emperor Justinian I.

A section of the easternmost preserved stretch of fortification walls at the site bear clear signs of having been repaired at a significantly later date than its 4th century BC original construction. The repairs can stylistically be dated to the early Byzantine period, and includes two additional towers. The fortifications deviate from the second phase wall at the foot of the hill, to follow the curvature of the terrain along the slope. The wall of this phase is considerably thinner than that of its predecessors, being only 1.65 m wide, and is constructed in un-tooled stones joined with mortar.

The walled area of this phase appears only to have been confined to the southern slope of the hill, with fragmentary remains of buildings noted in the steep terrain. The foundations of a small three-aisled church are visible at the top of the slope, probably belonging to the same period as the fourth phase fortifications.

The re-fortification of the site at Vlochos can possibly be linked with the building programmes initiated by the Eastern Roman emperor Justinian I. Evidence for similar re-fortification has been found at other sites in Thessaly, including at Pharsalos, Echinos, and Halos, and additional fortresses that were repaired at the same time are known from Procopius. Coins of Justinian have been found at the site, further supporting an early 6th century AD date for the last phase of habitation.

The reason behind this programme of re-fortification was probably the growing political instability on the Balkans at this time. Several Turkic and Slavic peoples migrated into or raided the Roman lands from across the Danube in the middle of the 6th century AD, creating the need for fortresses and other places of refuge.

== Inscriptions ==
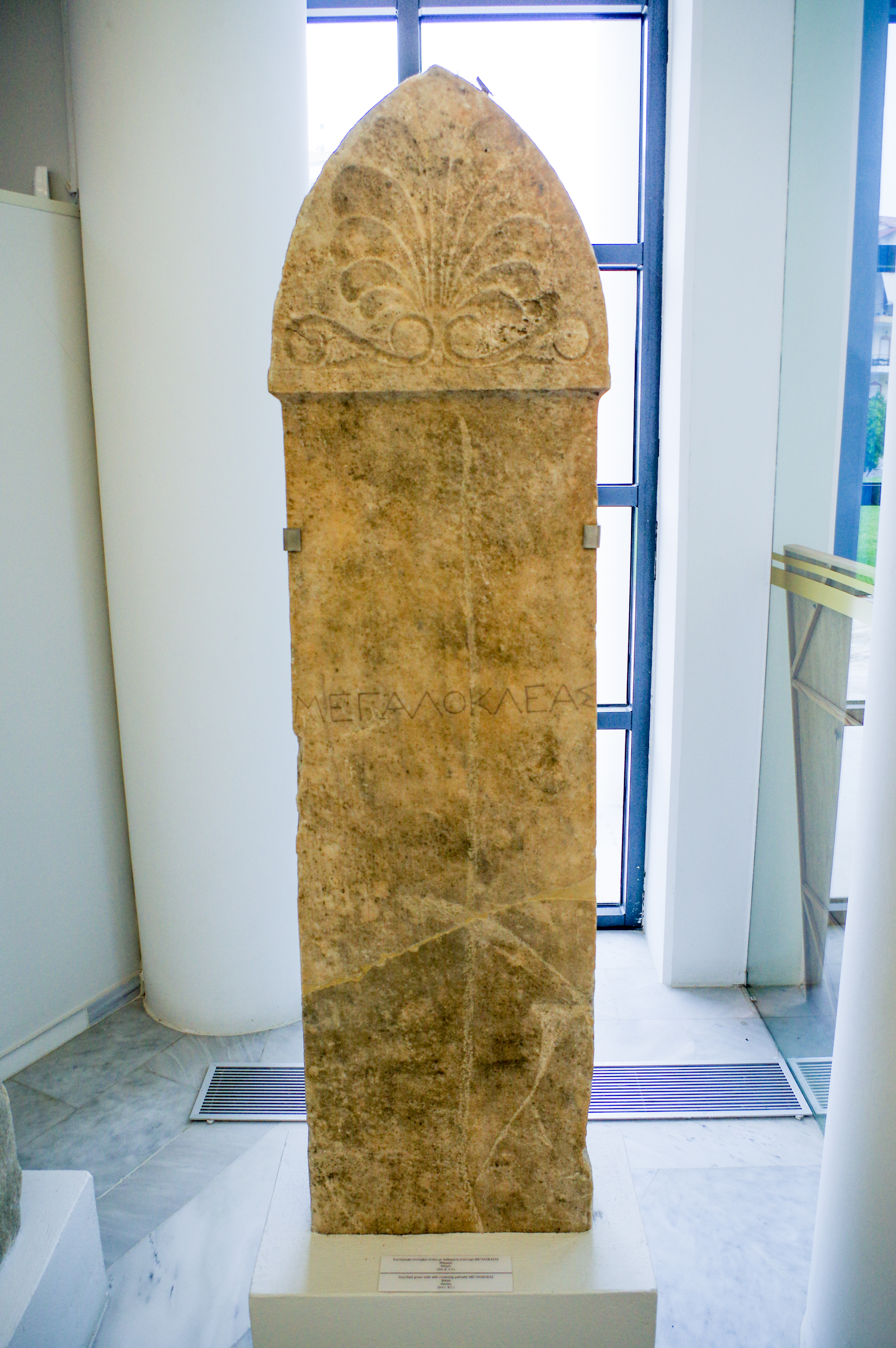
Funerary stele of Megalokleas, Vlochos. Hellenistic period. Exhibited in the Archaeological Museum of Karditsa.

In total 13 inscriptions have been published from the area of Vlochos. The oldest is an early Classical dedication to Poseidon by Kinon, an archegetes, written in the local Thessalian alphabet. The inscription was found during roadworks in the 1930s, and is presently exhibited at the Archaeological Museum of Almyros. An additional four dedications to unknown deities was found during rescue work in the 1960s, ranging from the early 4th to the 3rd century BC. Three funerary stelai have been recovered from the fields south of the ancient city, all of the 3rd or early 2nd century BC. Two, those of Megalokleas and Nikasippos son of Nikias, are displayed in the foyer of the Archaeological Museum of Karditsa.

== Present state of the archaeological remains ==
The remains at Vlochos have the status of a declared archaeological site, and is thus protected by Greek legislation. The site is open to the public, and can be accessed from the road Palamas-Keramidi. Signs direct toward the site from the national road at Palamas.

== See also ==
- Swedish Institute at Athens

== Sources ==
- Swedish Institute at Athens - Ancient Urbanism in Western Thessaly: A One-Day Workshop (2019): https://www.sia.gr/en/articles.php?tid=169&page=1
- Swedish Institute at Athens - Vlochos, Thessaly (2015– ongoing) (2020): https://www.sia.gr/en/articles.php?tid=113&page=1

== Notes ==
^aTraditionally but not securely identified with the site at Klokotos.
