= Henry Chapman =

Henry Chapman may refer to:

== Politicians ==
- Henry Chapman (MP) (1556–1623), member of parliament for Newcastle-on-Tyne
- Henry Chapman (American politician) (1804–1891), Democratic politician in Pennsylvania
- Henry Samuel Chapman (1803–1881), Australian and New Zealand judge, colonial secretary, attorney-general, journalist and politician
- Henry Chapman (New South Wales politician) (1846–1930), member of the New South Wales Legislative Assembly, 1898–1901

== Sportsmen ==
- Henry Chapman (cricketer) (1868–1942), Australian cricketer
- Henry Chapman (rower), 19th-century English rower

== Others ==
- Henry Cadwalader Chapman (1845–1909), American physician and naturalist
- Henry Grafton Chapman Jr. (1833–1883), American banker
- Henry N. Chapman, British physicist

== See also ==
- Henry Chapman Mercer (1856–1930), American archaeologist
