= Helene Whittaker =

Norwegian-Canadian archaeologist

Helène Whittaker
- Born: 18 March 1958 (age 68); Trondheim, Norway
- Citizenship: Canadian, Norwegian
- Known for: Archaeology, Classics

Academic background
- Education: University of Toronto, University of Tromsø
- Thesis: Mycenaean cult buildings : a study of their architecture and function in the context of the Aegean and Eastern Mediterranean (1997)
- Doctoral advisor: Joseph Shaw

Academic work
- Institutions: University of Bergen; University of Tromsø; University of Gothenburg; University of Bristol
- Doctoral students: Robin Rönnlund

Helène Whittaker (born 13 March 1958) is a Canadian-Norwegian archaeologist and scholar of antiquity. She is known for her work on the Bronze Age Aegean, ancient Greek and Roman language and culture, and Early Christianity. As of 2022, she is professor of Classical Archaeology and Ancient History at the University of Gothenburg in Sweden.

== Education and career ==
Whittaker studied languages and archeology at the University of Bergen, finishing her candidata philologiae in 1983. She continued her studies at the University of Tromsø and the University of Toronto, completing a Ph.D. in 1996.

Having been a senior lecturer at the University of Tromsø in 1994–2004, she was promoted to full professor at the same university in 2004. In 2009, she was the Peter W. Warren visiting professor in Aegean prehistory at the University of Bristol. In 2013, she accepted the position as professor of Classical Archaeology and Ancient History at the department of Historical Studies at the University of Gothenburg. Together with Maria Vaïopoulou, she directed the Greek-Swedish Vlochos Archaeological Project at Thessalian Vlochos in 2016–2018.

== Work ==
Whittaker is known for her work on archaeology and antiquity. A portion of her research examines the history of games, and she has commented on the historical significance of hnefatafl, an ancient board game that was common during the early Middle Ages.

== Selected publications ==
- Whittaker, Helène (1997). Mycenaean Cult Buildings. A Study of their Architecture and Function in the Context of the Aegean and Eastern Mediterranean.
- Lee, Geoff; Whittaker, Helene; Wrightson, Graham, eds. (2015). Ancient warfare : introducing current research. Newcastle upon Tyne: Cambridge Scholars Publishing. ISBN 978-1-4438-8236-1. OCLC 922704152.
- Whittaker, Helène (2014). Religion and Society in Middle Bronze Age Greece. New York: Cambridge University Press. ISBN 9781107049871.
- Whittaker, Helène (2018). "Approaches to Popular Religion in Late Bronze Age Greece". In Vavouranakis, Giorgos; Kopanias, Konstantinos; Kanellopoulos, Chrysanthos (eds.). Popular Religion and Ritual in Prehistoric and Ancient Greece and the Eastern Mediterranean. Oxford: Archaeopress. pp. 55–62.
- Vaïopoulou, Maria; Whittaker, Helene; Rönnlund, Robin; Tsiouka, Fotini; Klange, Johan; Pitman, Derek; Potter, Rich; Shaw, Lawrence; Hagan, Josephine; Siljedahl, Ellen; Forssén, Matilda; Chandrasekaran, Sujatha; Dandou, Sotiria; Forsblom Ljungdahl, Veronica; Pavilionytė, Asta; Scott-Pratt, Hayden; Schager, Elisabet; Manley, Harry (2020). "The 2016–2018 Greek-Swedish archaeological project at Thessalian Vlochos, Greece". Opuscula. Annual of the Swedish Institutes at Athens and Rome. 13: 7–72. doi:10.30549/opathrom-13-02.

== Awards and honours ==
In 2014 Whittaker was named to the Royal Society of Sciences and Letters in Gothenburg. She was elected as a member of the Academia Europaea in 2020.
