= Peirasia =

- Πειρασία (Ancient Greek)
- Asterium
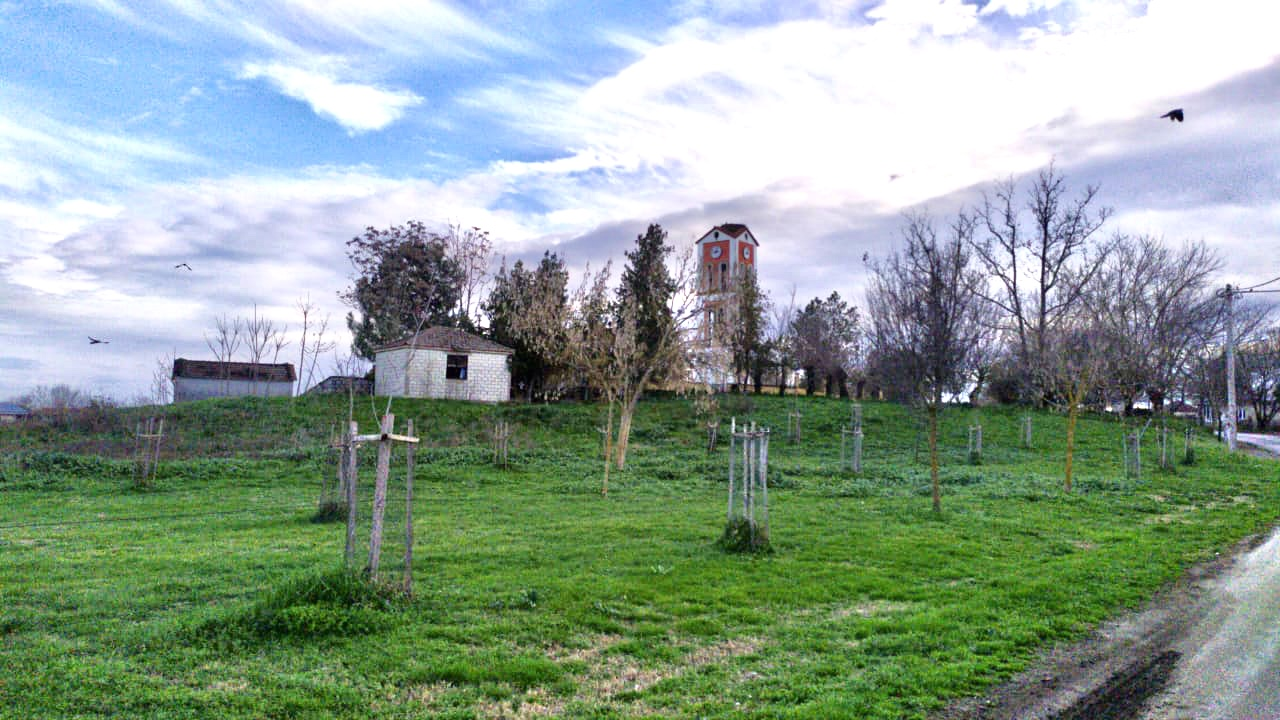
- The site of Peirasia at modern Ermitsi

- Location within Greece
- 39°25′13″N 22°06′11″E
- Type: Settlement
- Cultures: Ancient Greece
- Location: Ermitsi
- Region: Karditsa (regional unit), Greece

Site notes
- Archaeologists: Leonidas Hatziangelakis
- Website: http://odysseus.culture.gr/h/3/gh352.jsp?obj_id=20626

Peirasia (Ancient Greek: Πειρασία) or Peiresia, was an ancient Greek polis (city-state), located in the tetrad of Thessaliotis in western Thessaly, close to the confluences of Apidanus and Enipeus. In mythological sources, it is often connected with Asterium, the home of Asterion, one of the Argonauts. The site of Peirasia has recently been securely identified with the archaeological remains at Ermitsi in the region of Karditsa.

Until the find at Ermitsi of stamped roof-tiles bearing the inscription (P)eirasi(eōn) ("of the Peirasieans"), the site of Peirasia was generally assumed to be at Vlochos or Sykeona. The site at Ermitsi is that of a large multi-period tell or magoula, upon the present village is located. Excavations on and around the tell by the Ephorate of Antiquities of Karditsa have yielded finds of the Neolithic until the Hellenistic period. The layout of the ancient settlement is unknown as it is nearly completely covered by modern buildings and houses.

Peirasia struck coins in the 4th century BC, depicting Athena Itonia on the obverse, and a horseman on the reverse, with the legend Peirasieōn.
