= Methydrion =

Methydrion (Ancient Greek: Μεθύδριον) may refer to:

- Methydrio, a town in Arcadia, Greece
- Methydrium, a town of ancient Arcadia, Greece
- Methydrion (Thessaly), a city of ancient Thessaly, Greece
