= Larry Shaw =

Larry or Lawrence Shaw may refer to:

- Larry Shaw (politician), American politician
- Larry Shaw (director), American film and television director
- Larry Shaw (editor) (1924–1985), American writer
- Larry Shaw (physicist) (1939–2017), American physicist and founder of Pi Day
- Lawrence Shaw (archaeologist), British archaeologist
- Buck Shaw (Lawrence Timothy Shaw, 1899–1977), American football player, shot putter, and coach
- Larry Shaw, physicist and inventor of Astrojax
