= Rönnlund =

Rönnlund is a Swedish surname. Notable people with the surname include:

- Anna Rosling Rönnlund, Swedish designer
- Assar Rönnlund (1935–2011), Swedish cross-country skier
- Ulla-Karin Rönnlund (born 1977), Swedish football goalkeeper
- Robin Rönnlund (born 1985), Swedish archaeologist.
