= Robin Rönnlund =

Swedish archaeologist (born 1985)

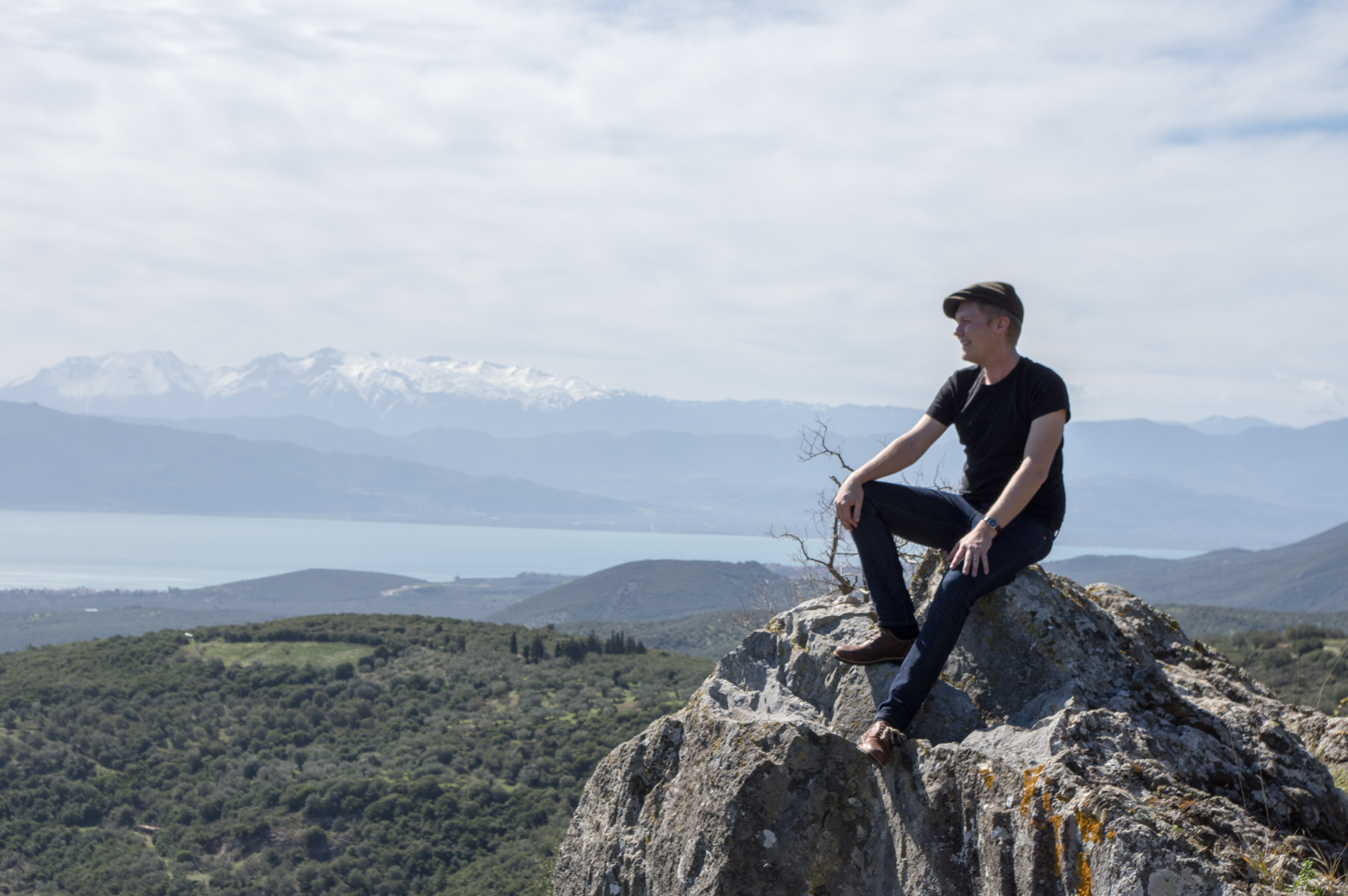
- Rönnlund in 2019
- Born: 1985 (age 40–41); Solna, Sweden
- Education: University of Gothenburg
- Known for: Vlochos (archaeological site)
- Scientific career
- Fields: Archaeology
- Workplaces: University of Gothenburg; University of Thessaly; Swedish Institute at Athens
- Doctoral advisor: Helene Whittaker, Rune Frederiksen

Robin Rönnlund (Swedish pronunciation: [ˈrɔ̌bːɪn ˈrœ̂nːlɵnd]; born 1985) is a Swedish archaeologist of the University of Thessaly and Swedish Institute at Athens, known for his work in and on Ancient Thessaly.

== Education and career ==
Rönnlund received his Bachelor's and master's degrees in Classical Archaeology and Ancient History at Stockholm University, before continuing to complete a PhD in the same subject at the University of Gothenburg. The topic of his doctoral thesis was Greek akropoleis and their function and symbolic meaning in ancient society. Rönnlund is currently the Wenner-Gren fellow at the department of History, Archaeology and Social Anthropology at the University of Thessaly, researching cyclic urbanism in the ancient Greek world.

Having led the work in the field since 2016, Rönnlund took over the role of director for the Swedish side of the Greek-Swedish survey of the archaeological site at Thessalian Vlochos from Helene Whittaker of the University of Gothenburg. The work, which is a collaboration with the Ephorate of Antiquities of Karditsa, focusses on mapping and understanding the complex series of discrete urban remains at the site, how and when they were established and why they were so completely abandoned.

== Selected publications ==
- R. Rönnlund (2023), The Cities of the Plain: Urbanism in Ancient Western Thessaly, Oxbow Books.
- Vaïopoulou, Maria; Whittaker, Helene; Rönnlund, Robin; Tsiouka, Fotini; Klange, Johan; Pitman, Derek; Potter, Rich; Shaw, Lawrence; Hagan, Josephine; Siljedahl, Ellen; Forssén, Matilda; Chandrasekaran, Sujatha; Dandou, Sotiria; Forsblom Ljungdahl, Veronica; Pavilionytė, Asta; Scott-Pratt, Hayden; Schager, Elisabet; Manley, Harry (2020). "The 2016–2018 Greek-Swedish archaeological project at Thessalian Vlochos, Greece". Opuscula. Annual of the Swedish Institutes at Athens and Rome. 13: 7–72. doi:10.30549/opathrom-13-02.
- Vaïopoulou, Maria; Rönnlund, Robin; Tsiouka, Fotini; Pitman, Derek; Dandou, Sotiria; Potter, Rich; Klange, Johan (2021). "Some preliminary notes on the limited 2020 campaign of the Palamas Archaeological Project (PAP)". Opuscula. Annual of the Swedish Institutes at Athens and Rome. 14: 55–63. doi:10.30549/opathrom-14-04.
- R. Rönnlund (2018), A city on a hill cannot be hidden: Function and symbolism of ancient Greek akropoleis. PhD thesis.
- R. Rönnlund (2015), 'All that we see or seem: Space, memory and Greek akropoleis', Archaeological Review from Cambridge, pp. 37–43.
