= Ichnae (Thessaly) =

Ichnae (Ancient Greek: Ἴχναι) was a town in ancient Thessaly. Strabo wrote that it is in the district of Thessaliotis and adds that it is the place where Themis Ichnae was venerated. The mention of "Ichnae" as epithet of Themis also appears in the Homeric Hymn to Apollo and in the Alexandra of Lycophron. It is assumed that the epithet derives from the town of Ichnae but it has also been suggested that, since the meaning of Ἴχναι is "the one who tracks," a quality which is perfectly applicable for a goddess of justice, it could be that the toponym of Ichnae derives from the epithet. Its site in unlocated.
