= Limnaea (Thessaly) =

Coordinates: 39°30′37″N 22°05′17″E

Limnaea or Limnaia (Ancient Greek: Λιμναία) or Limnaeum or Limnaion (Λιμναίον) was a town of Histiaeotis in ancient Thessaly, taken by the Romans in 191 BCE.

Its location is within the bounds of the modern town of Vlochos.
