= Derek Pitman =

British archaeologist (born 1983)

Derek Pitman FHEA
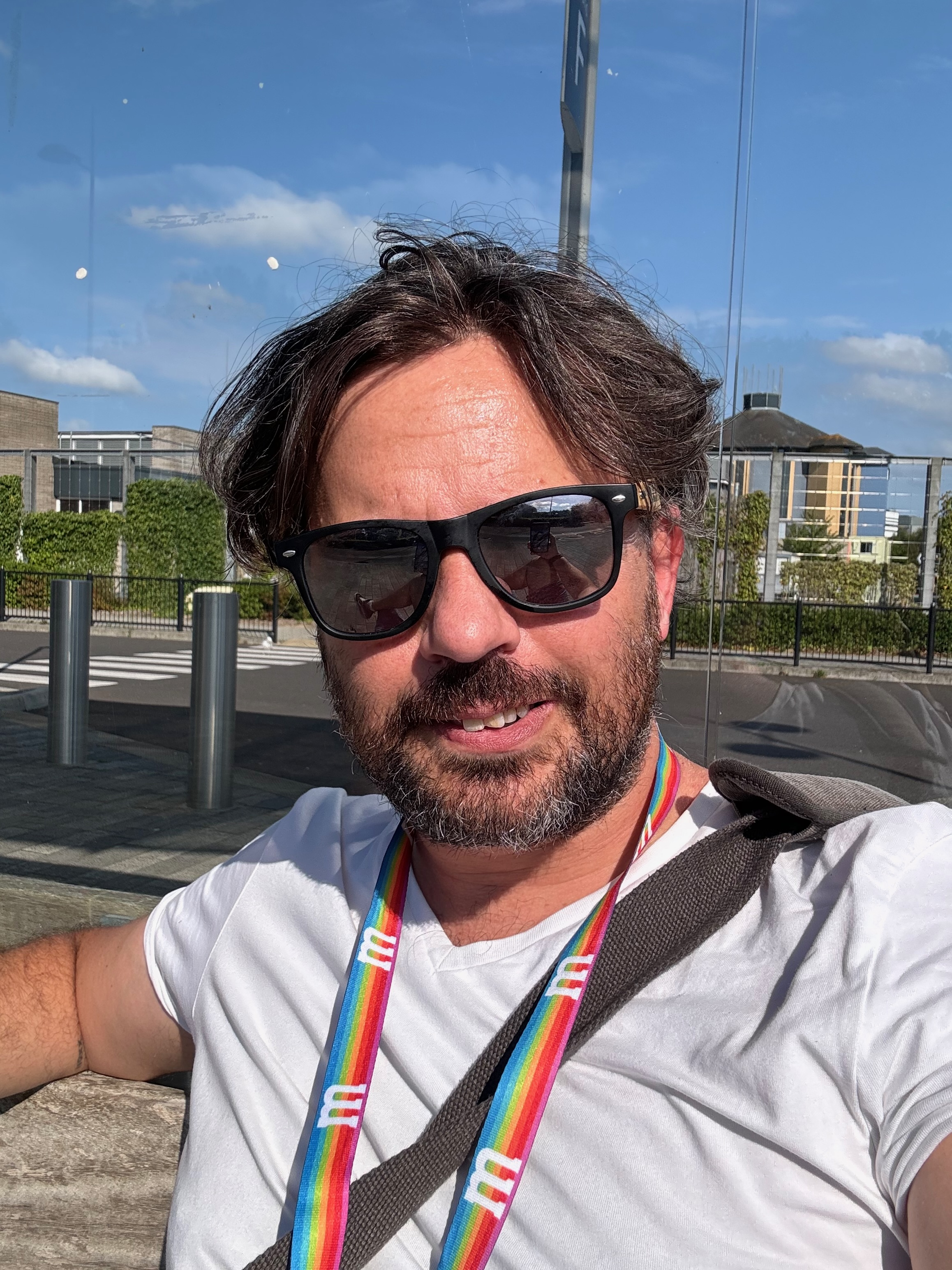
- Pitman at Bournemouth University in 2024
- Born: Derek Shaun Pitman; 10 August 1983 (age 43); Dorset, England
- Education: University of Sheffield
- Known for: Time Team, Career in Ruins
- Scientific career
- Fields: Archaeology
- Workplaces: Bournemouth University, Swedish Institute at Athens

Derek Pitman is a British archaeologist, academic, and presenter, specialising in ancient metallurgy and geophysical prospection. Associate Professor in Archaeology and Anthropology at Bournemouth University.

== Education and career ==
Pitman received his bachelor's degree in Archaeology at Bournemouth University before studying a masters in Archaeomaterials at the University of Sheffield. He researched his PhD, entitled “Craft Practice and Resource Perception in the Southern Urals During the Middle Bronze Age” at the University of Sheffield.

Since 2018 Pitman has led Bournemouth University's excavations at Wytch Farm in Dorset, and he is the survey director of the ongoing Greek-Swedish Palamas Archaeological Project at Thessalian Vlochos, Greece. He has also worked and published on Swedish, Spanish, Russian, and New Zealand archaeology.

== Media appearances ==
Pitman is a host and co-creator (together with Lawrence Shaw) of the archaeology podcast Career in Ruins.

Pitman joined the revived series of Time Team in 2022 as one of the programme’s archaeologists and presenters. Since then, he has appeared in more than a dozen episodes, contributing field expertise on excavations across Britain. He featured prominently in the 2023 investigation of Iron Age burials at Wytch Farm in Dorset, working alongside colleague Lawrence Shaw, and has also presented studio segments in special episodes, including the Time Team 2025 preview.

== Selected publications ==
- Vaïopoulou, Maria; Whittaker, Helene; Rönnlund, Robin; Tsiouka, Fotini; Klange, Johan; Pitman, Derek; Potter, Rich; Shaw, Lawrence; Hagan, Josephine; Siljedahl, Ellen; Forssén, Matilda; Chandrasekaran, Sujatha; Dandou, Sotiria; Forsblom Ljungdahl, Veronica; Pavilionytė, Asta; Scott-Pratt, Hayden; Schager, Elisabet; Manley, Harry (2020). "The 2016–2018 Greek-Swedish archaeological project at Thessalian Vlochos, Greece". Opuscula. Annual of the Swedish Institutes at Athens and Rome. 13: 7–72. doi:10.30549/opathrom-13-02.
- Vaïopoulou, Maria; Rönnlund, Robin; Tsiouka, Fotini; Pitman, Derek; Dandou, Sotiria; Potter, Rich; Klange, Johan (2021). "Some preliminary notes on the limited 2020 campaign of the Palamas Archaeological Project (PAP)". Opuscula. Annual of the Swedish Institutes at Athens and Rome. 14: 55–63. doi:10.30549/opathrom-14-04.
- H. Manley, D. Pitman, E. Wilkes, A. Brown, C. Randall, and D. Carter (2020). "Poole Harbour: Current understanding of the Later Prehistoric to Medieval archaeology and future directions for research". Proceedings of the Dorset Natural History & Archaeological Society 141, 71–97.
- A. Brown and D. Pitman (2019). "Resource procurement and inter-regional connections in pre-contact Taranaki, New Zealand: New evidence from geochemical analysis of obsidian". Archaeology in Oceania 54(3), 149–162.
- M. Russell, P. Cheetham, K. Barrass, D. Evans, E. Hambleton, H. Manley, D. Pitman, and D. Stewart, (2019). "The Durotriges Project 2017: an interim statement". Proceedings of the Dorset Natural History & Archaeological Society 139, 127–133.
