= Filia =

Filia may refer to:

- FiLiA, a British gender-critical feminist charity
- Filia, Anglicized form of filija, a Serbian dish
- Filia, a village in the commune of Brăduț, Covasna County, Romania

== See also ==
- Fyllia, a village in Nicosia District, Cyprus
