= Jacqueline McKinley =

British archaeologist and osteoarchaeologist

Jacqueline McKinley FSA is a British archaeologist and osteoarchaeologist specialising in human remains and cremation burials in particular. She has been a regular contributor to TV programs on archaeology including Time Team and has been a guest on the BBC Radio 4 program The Life Scientific.

== Archaeological career ==
McKinley’s archaeological career began in 1977. She joined Wessex Archaeology in 1993 as a field archaeologist and osteoarchaeologist and went on to become their principal osteoarchaeologist. She is an expert on human remains focussing on cremations including rituals and funeral pyres.

She is a founder member of the British Association for Biological Anthropology and Osteoarchaeology and a member of the Advisory Panel on the Archaeology of Burials in England. She was elected a fellow of the Society of Antiquaries (FSA) in 2009. She is the co-author of the Chartered Institute for Archaeologists’ Guidelines to the Standards for Recording Human Remains. She is the author or over 30 archaeological monographs and reports and contributing author to more than 80 book chapters and articles.

== Media career ==
Her broadcasting career began with appearances on Time Team where she became a regular contributor for sites with human remains. She also contributed to other TV archaeology documentaries such as "The Secret Skeletons Beneath Stonehenge". In March 2025 she was a guest on the BBC Radio 4 programme The Life Scientific where she was interviewed by Jim Al-Khalili.
