= Frank Martínez (artist) =

American painter (1924–2013)

- Born: Francisco Alonzo Martínez; August 9, 1924; Los Angeles, California, United States
- Died: August 17, 2013 (aged 89); Los Angeles, California, United States
- Education: Borough Polytechnic Institute; Chouinard Art Institute; Otis College of Art and Design
- Known for: Painting
- Movement: Mexican American heritage

Francisco Alonzo "Frank" Martínez (August 9, 1924 – August 17, 2013) was an American artist. He painted murals of his Mexican American heritage.

== Early years and World War II ==
Martínez was born in 1924, in Los Angeles, California, to Mexican migrant farmworkers. In his youth, he worked with his parents harvesting crops, while harboring a desire to be an artist. In 1943, he enlisted in the United States Army and served as a unit medic in the European theatre of World War II. He participated in the Omaha Beach invasion in Normandy, France. He went on to serve in four major campaigns in Europe and received four battle stars.

== Art career ==
Once the war ended, Martínez went to London to study at the Borough Polytechnic Institute (now London South Bank University). He returned to the U.S. in 1947 and continued his studies at the Chouinard Art Institute (now CalArts) in Los Angeles until 1951, lastly enrolling at the Otis College of Art and Design.

Never earning a degree and due to his growing family, Martínez began designing lamps for a company in Van Nuys in 1956. He worked for the company until the mid-1980s. In 1976, the Smithsonian Institution commissioned him and four other California artists to paint a mural for the United States Bicentennial celebration. He traveled to Washington, D.C., to complete his part, which depicted the early pueblo years of Los Angeles. He would go on to create large-scale murals for the 1984 Summer Olympics and Phoenix Sky Harbor International Airport. One of his last works hangs in the Cathedral of Our Lady of the Angels in Los Angeles. It is a layered mural of early 18th century life, mission-building and Catholic faith in California.

== Exhibitions ==
Martínez's work over the years was characterized by constant evolution. His works became a regular feature at numerous shows and exhibitions. His works are part of many private and corporate collections, including The Smithsonian Institution, University of Southern California, and the Southern California Gas Company. His works were collected and became part of many private collections such as that of Vidal Sassoon and the Cathedral of Our Lady of the Angels in Los Angeles.

== Personal life ==
Shortly after returning to the U.S. in 1947, Martínez met and married Esther Silva. They had a daughter and four sons, two of which preceded him in death. Late in life, Martínez was diagnosed with diabetes and Parkinson's disease. However, he did not let either disrupt his work. He developed ways to use the Parkinson's to his advantage by drawing sketches directly on the canvas, rather than in a book. On August 17, 2013, Martínez, aged 89, died at Northridge Hospital Medical Center in Los Angeles of complications from diabetes and renal disease.
