= Henry Chapman (cricketer) =

Australian cricketer

Personal information
- Born: 7 January 1868; Tredegar, Wales
- Died: 5 May 1942 (aged 74); Brisbane, Queensland, Australia
- Source: Cricinfo, 1 October 2020

Henry Chapman (7 January 1868 – 5 May 1942) was an Australian cricketer. He played in two first-class matches for Queensland between 1895 and 1902.

== See also ==
- List of Queensland first-class cricketers
