= Rachel Pope =

Archaeologist

- Occupation: archaeologist

Academic background
- Education: Durham University
- Thesis: Prehistoric Dwelling: circular structures in north and central Britain c2500 BC – AD 500

Academic work
- Institutions: University of Liverpool

Rachel Pope FSA is an archaeologist specialising in Iron Age Europe. She is Professor of European Prehistory at the University of Liverpool.

== Education ==
Pope undertook undergraduate and postgraduate degrees at Durham University. Her PhD thesis was entitled "Prehistoric Dwelling: circular structures in north and central Britain c 2500 BC - AD 500", was awarded in 2003, and funded partly through support provided by the British Federation of Women Graduates and St Mary's College.

== Career ==
In 2004 Pope held an early career fellowship at the University of Leicester. Pope's research includes Iron Age hillforts, the Celts, and gender.

Pope has directed excavations at the Kidlandlee Dean Bronze Age Landscapes Project (Northumberland) and Eddisbury Hillfort, Merrick’s Hill (Cheshire), and at Penycloddiau Hillfort. She co-edited the volume The Earlier Iron Age in Britain and the near Continent with Colin Haselgrove, which provided a thorough "overview of research into the early first millennium BC". She was elected as a Fellow of the Society of Antiquaries in 2008. Pope is director of British Women Archaeologists. She is a key member of campaign to stop development at Old Oswestry Hillfort. Pope was featured in the Leonora Saunders and TrowelBlazers Raising Horizons exhibition as Margaret Guido.

Pope was one of the authors, all of whom "have experienced prolonged covid-19 symptoms, and have participated in various kinds of Long Covid advocacy", of an October 2020 opinion piece in The BMJ on the importance of using the "patient made" term Long Covid.

== Selected publications ==
- Pope, R. E. (2007). Ritual and the roundhouse: a critique of recent ideas on domestic space in later British prehistory. In C. C. Haselgrove, & R. E. Pope (Eds.), The Earlier Iron Age in Britain and the near Continent. Oxford: Oxbow: 204-228.
- Ghey, E., Edwards, N., and Pope, R. (2007) Characterising the Welsh Roundhouse: chronology, inhabitation and landscape, Internet Archaeology 23. doi:10.11141/ia.23.1
- Pope, R. (2011). Processual archaeology and gender politics. The loss of innocence. Archaeological Dialogues 18(01): 59-86. https://doi.org/10.1017/S1380203811000134
- Pope, R. E., & Ralston, I. B. M. (2011). Approaching Sex and Status in Iron Age Britain with Reference to the Nearer Continent. In L. Armada, & T. Moore (eds), Atlantic Europe in the First Millennium BC. Oxford: Oxford University Press.
- Pope, R. E. (2012). Gender in British Prehistory. In D. Bolger (eds), A Companion to Gender Prehistory. Oxford: Blackwell.
- Pope, R. E. (2015). Bronze Age architectural traditions: dates and landscapes. In F. Hunter, & I.B.M. Ralston (eds), Scotland in Later Prehistoric Europe. Oxford: Oxbow.
- Pope, R. E. (2018). Gender and society in Iron Age Europe. In C. C. Haselgrove, K. Rebay-Salisbury, & P. Wells (eds) Oxford Handbook of the European Iron Age. Oxford: Oxford University Press.
- Pope, R. (2022). Re-approaching Celts: Origins, society, and social change. Journal of Archaeological Research, 1-67. https://doi.org/10.1007/s10814-021-09157-1
