= Nicole Sunitsch =

Austrian politician (born 1979)

Member of the National Council
- Incumbent
- Assumed office 24 October 2024
- Constituency: Styria

Personal details
- Born: 17 August 1979 (age 46)
- Party: Freedom Party

Nicole Sunitsch (born 17 August 1979) is an Austrian politician of the Freedom Party serving as a member of the National Council since 2024. She has been a city councillor of Sankt Michael in Obersteiermark since 2020.
