= Lawrence Shaw (archaeologist) =

British archaeologist (born 1986)

Lawrence Edwin Shaw
- Born: 1986 (age 39–40); West Sussex, England
- Education: University of Birmingham
- Known for: Career in ruins
- Scientific career
- Fields: Archaeology
- Workplaces: Bournemouth University, University of Winchester

Lawrence Shaw is a British archaeologist and the lead historic environment advisor for Forestry England. Shaw has worked and published on archaeological sites in Britain, Greece, Spain, the Cook Islands, and Easter Island.

== Media appearances ==
Shaw is a host and co-creator (together with Derek Pitman) of the archaeology podcast Career in Ruins. He has also appeared on multiple episodes of the online revival spin off of the British Archeological TV programme Time Team, Time Team's Tea Time. Shaw also appeared on the BBC Radio 4 programme Gardeners’ Question Time.

In 2021 Shaw was announced as a member of Time Team for their crowd funded revival. In addition to being part of the team he presents the companion programme "Dig Watch" that gives behind the scenes access to the production of the new episodes alongside Career in Ruins co-host Derek Pitman

== Selected publications ==
- Shaw, Lawrence and K. Challis. “"There's an App For That": Building Smartphone Applications to Improve the Ergonomics of Landscape Study, Analysis and Interpretation.” Visual Heritage in the Digital Age (2013).
- Welham, K., Shaw, L., Dover, M., Manley, H., Parker Pearson, M., Pollard, J., Richards, C., Thomas, J. and Tilley, C. 2015 Google Under-the-Earth: Seeing Beneath Stonehenge using Google Earth - a Tool for Public Engagement and the Dissemination of Archaeological Data, Internet Archaeology 40. https://doi.org/10.11141/ia.40.5
- M. Vaïopoulou, H. Whittaker, R. Rönnlund, F. Tsiouka, J. Klange, D. Pitman, L. Shaw et al. (2020), "The 2016–2018 Greek-Swedish archaeological project at Thessalian Vlochos, Greece", Opuscula. Annual of the Swedish Institutes at Athens and Rome 13, 7–72.
