= Methylion =

Coordinates: 39°24′30″N 21°57′43″E

Methylion (Ancient Greek: Μεθύλιον) was a town and polis (city-state) in ancient Thessaly. Methylion minted coins dated to the 5th and 4th centuries BCE with the legends «ΜΕΘΥ» and «ΜΕΘΥΛΙΕΩΝ». In addition, there is epigraphic evidence dated to 230-220 BCE of a theorodokos of Methylion. Stephanus of Byzantium refers to the town as Methydrion (Μεθύδριον).

Its location is near modern Mirina, where excavations have uncovered floor tiles dated to the third century BCE bearing the inscription "Μεθυλιέων".
