= Vlochos =

Vlochos Βλοχός
- Community
- Location within Greece
- Coordinates: 39°31′N 22°05′E
- Country: Greece
- Administrative region: Thessaly
- Regional unit: Karditsa
- Municipality: Palamas
- Municipal unit: Palamas

Population (2021)
  - Community: 464
- Time zone: UTC+2 (EET)
  - Summer (DST): UTC+3 (EEST)

Vlochos (Greek: Βλοχός) is a village in modern Thessaly, Greece. It belongs to the municipality of Palamas in the regional unit of Karditsa.

== History ==
Just south of the village lies the steep hill of Strongilovouni (Greek: Στρογγυλοβούνι), the site of an extensive ancient settlement. The remains at Strongilovouni are studied by the Ephorate of Antiquities of Karditsa and the Swedish Institute at Athens in an ongoing collaborative project.

Vlochos was seriously affected by Storm Daniel in September 2023. The town flooded and the vast majority of the 700 residents moved to nearby cities.
