= Ephorate of Antiquities of Karditsa =

Greek government agency

- Εφορεία Αρχαιοτήτων Καρδίτσας; ΕΦΑΚ

Agency overview
- Formed: 2004
- Jurisdiction: Greek Ministry of Culture and Sports
- Headquarters: Loukianou 1, Karditsa
- Website: http://ldepka.culture.gr/

The Ephorate of Antiquities of Karditsa (formerly the 34th Ephorate of Prehistoric and Classical Antiquities) is a department within the Greek Ministry of Culture and Sports, responsible for the protection and management of archaeological sites within the region of Karditsa, Thessaly. The offices are located in the regional capital of Karditsa. The archaeologist Maria Vaïopoulou is the director of the agency.

== Archaeological museums ==
- Archaeological Museum of Karditsa (gr)

== Archaeological sites ==
- Archaic temple of Apollo, at ancient Metropolis.
- Temple of Athena Itonia at Filia.
- Ancient city of Gomphoi.
- Ancient city of Kierion.
- Ancient city at Vlochos.
- Mycenaean tholos tomb at Georgiko.
