= Henry Cadwalader Chapman =

American physician

Dr. Henry Chapman
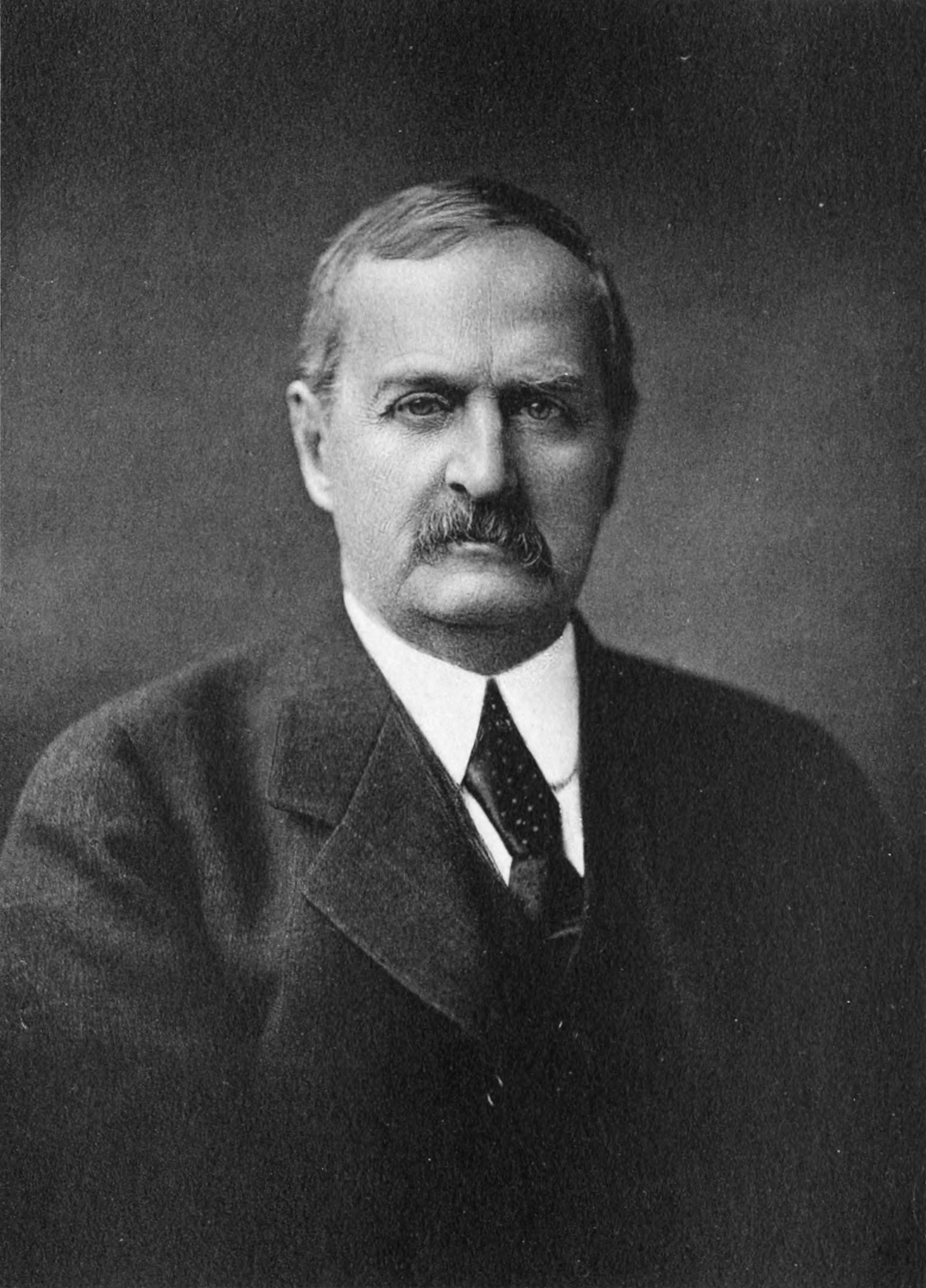
- Born: August 17, 1845; Philadelphia, Pennsylvania
- Died: September 7, 1909 (aged 64); Bar Harbor, Maine
- Education: University of Pennsylvania
- Relatives: Nathaniel Chapman (grandfather)

Dr. Henry Cadwalader Chapman (August 17, 1845 – September 7, 1909) was an American physician and naturalist.

== Early life ==
Chapman was born in Philadelphia, Pennsylvania. Henry was the son of George W. Chapman, lieutenant in the United States Army, and Emily, granddaughter of Abraham Markoe, first captain of the Philadelphia City Troop. His grandfather was Dr. Nathaniel Chapman, the founding president of the American Medical Association.

He graduated from the University of Pennsylvania in 1864 and then matriculated into the medical department. In 1867 he took his M. D. with a thesis on "Generation." He entered the Pennsylvania Hospital, first as an assistant in the apothecary shop, and later as a resident physician, but in 1869 went to Europe for three years' study with Sir Richard Owen, London; Alphonse Milne-Edwards, Paris; Emil du Bois-Reymond, Berlin; and Josef Hyrtl, Vienna.

== Career ==
On his return from Europe he prepared for publication his first work, The Evolution of Life, issued in 1872. Joseph Leidy, and the naturalist Timothy Abbott Conrad were his warm friends, and sponsors for his election to the Academy of Natural Sciences, to the proceedings of which he often contributed. He became a director of the Zoological Society of Philadelphia in 1881, was its secretary in 1884 and corresponding secretary 1890–1904. He was elected as a member of the American Philosophical Society in 1875.

From 1873 to 1876 he was Leidy's assistant in the University of Pennsylvania and lectured on anatomy and physiology. The next year he was a curator of the Academy, succeeding George W. Tryon, Jr., and served again in 1891, to fill the vacancy caused by the death of Leidy. From 1877 to 1880 he was demonstrator of physiology in association with James Aiken Meigs in Jefferson Medical College, and 1879–1880 was curator of the museum; in 1878 the college gave him his second degree in medicine, when his thesis was the "Persistence of Forces in Biology." Meigs died in the autumn of 1879, soon after starting his lectures for the term, and the course was continued by Chapman who, in 1880, was appointed to the vacant chair of institutes of medicine and medical jurisprudence. From 1878 to 1885 he served as professor of physiology in the Pennsylvania College of Dental Surgery. The University of Pennsylvania gave him the degree of Doctor of Science in 1908.

Chapman wrote much on the anatomy of apes and was fortunate in securing a gorilla (1878) and a chimpanzee (1899) for dissection; practically all the valuable material coming out of the Philadelphia Zoological Garden passed through his hands. He records in a report that his experience as prosector showed "that the principal causes of deaths during the first six months of the existence of the Garden were improper food, badly regulated temperature and ill constructed cages."

His articles on the placenta of an elephant and on the placentation of the kangaroo "are his most important contributions to original research" (Nolan). For nearly thirty years he spent his summers at Bar Harbor, Maine, where he devoted himself to its flora and fauna.

Nolan, his biographer, states that Chapman's History of the Discovery of the Circulation of the Blood (1884) is, "from a literary point of view, the author's most satisfactory work.

== Personal life ==
Chapman married Hannah Naglee Megargee (1849–1931), daughter of Samuel Megargee.

He died at his home at Bar Harbor, from hemorrhage, probably resulting from gastric ulcer, September 7, 1909. He was survived by his widow.
