= Tsitsipas (surname) =

Tsitsipas (Greek: Τσιτσιπάς); feminine form: Tsitsipa (Greek: Τσιτσιπά), is a Greek surname. Notable bearers of the name include:

- Apostolos Tsitsipas (born 1967), Greek tennis coach
- Petros Tsitsipas (born 2000), Greek tennis player
- Stefanos Tsitsipas (born 1998), Greek tennis player
