= Medvedev–Tsitsipas rivalry =

ATP tennis rivalry

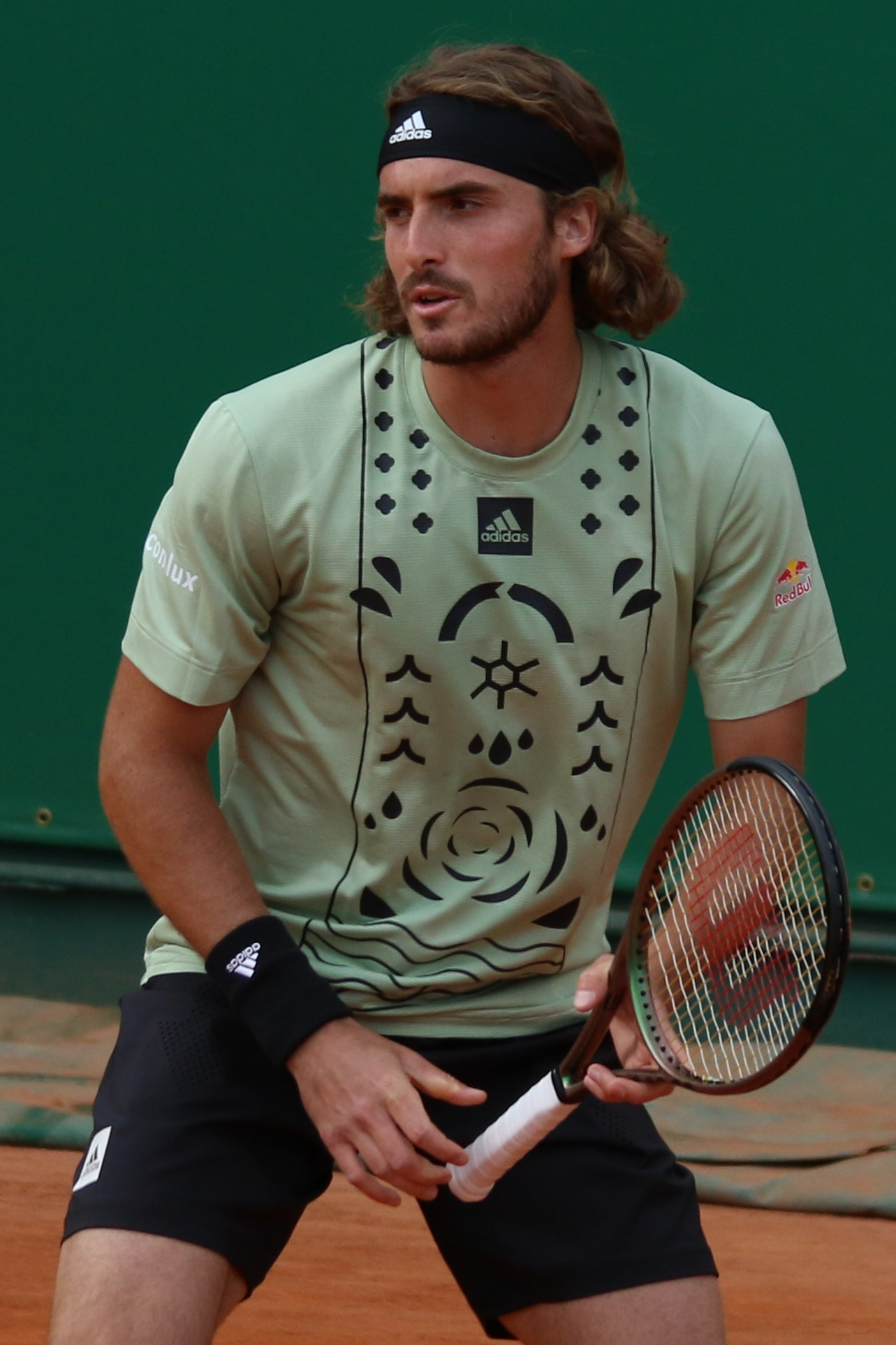
Stefanos Tsitsipas

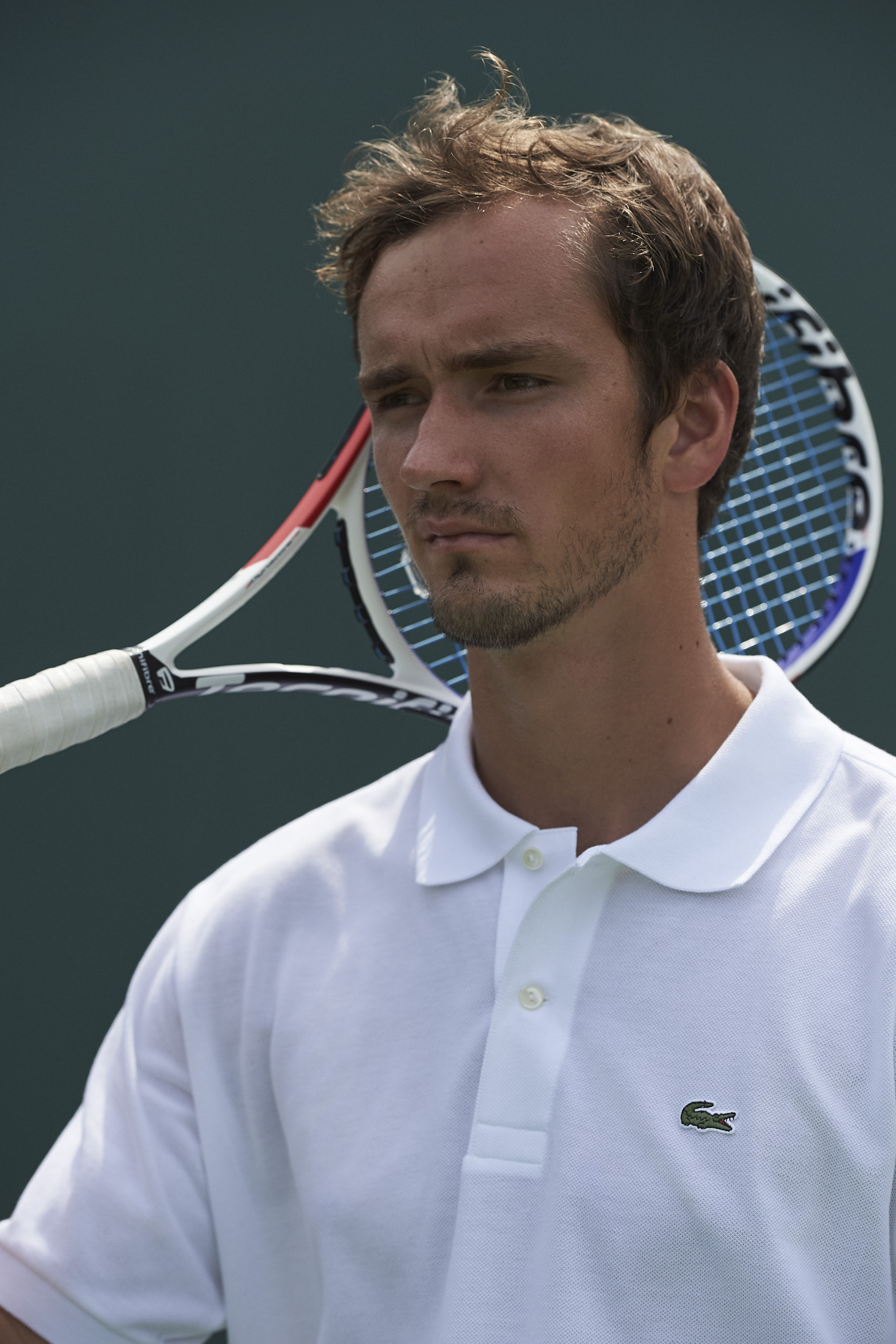
Daniil Medvedev

Association of Tennis Professionals (ATP) players Daniil Medvedev and Stefanos Tsitsipas have faced each other 16 times since 2018, with Medvedev leading the rivalry, 11–5. They are considered to be two of the best tennis players of their generation. According to the BBC, "The pair have long had a spiky relationship and, while there is respect and cordiality, an element of drama always appears when they meet".

== Notable matches ==
=== 2018 Miami Open first round ===
External videos
- Post-match encounter at the 2018 Miami Open on YouTube. Medvedev yelled to Tsitsipas: "Man, you better shut your fuck up, okay? Hey Stefanos, you wanna look at me and talk? You have some problems, you go emergency toilet for five minutes? ... And then you hit let and you don't say sorry, you think you are a good kid? Look at me! Hey, look at me, huh? You don't look at me? He started it. He started it. He started it. Yes, he started it. He said 'bullshit Russian', you think this is normal? I answer him because he doesn't know how to fight. He's a small kid who doesn't know how to fight. If he doesn't say anything, I have no problems with him. But if he says something to me and he wants to fight, he needs to do it. But he doesn't look at me after".

Medvedev and Tsitsipas first played each other in the first round of the 2018 Miami Open, when both were ranked outside of the top 50 and were 22 and 19 years old respectively. Medvedev made a comeback after dropping the first set to win 6–2 in the third. However, the match is better remembered for a verbal altercation after the players shook hands. Russian Medvedev was upset about some of his opponent's etiquette during the match, especially the Greek's muttered "bullshit Russian" heard at the net, and yelled at Tsitsipas from his bench, "Man, you better shut your [sic] fuck up, okay?" He then got up and began complaining that Tsitsipas had taken a long bathroom break (Medvedev also took one) and took issue with Tsitsipas not apologizing for hitting the net cord during a point. As the chair umpire intervened, Tsitsipas quietly packed his bag to leave the court while Medvedev continued, "Look at me... He started it... He's a small kid who doesn't know how to fight".

Tsitsipas later said the "overall ambience" after the match was overly hostile. Of the "bullshit Russian" remark, he has said that Medvedev had been chiding him midmatch for not apologizing for hitting the net cord, but that he "did get pissed and said what I said, which I do regret".

In another interview from 2020, both players seemed to have moved past the incident. Medvedev said, "I do think that it's completely normal when something like this can happen, I mean, you're going to spend fifteen years on the tour and you're going to have some hot moments".

Tsitsipas, who was interviewed separately, said "I think it's also good for our sport to have such things... It makes it more colorful, more exciting for the fans, not that my intention was to do that, but you can always see things from their bright side".

=== 2019 ATP Finals round-robin ===
Tsitsipas scored his first win over Medvedev in their sixth meeting, in the group stage of the 2019 ATP Finals, an event that Tsitsipas eventually won. Tsitsipas never faced break point in the match, winning a close tiebreak in the first set and breaking Medvedev's serve once in the second. He said afterward, "It's a victory that I craved for a long time now".

=== 2022 Australian Open semifinal ===
At the 2022 Australian Open, No. 2 seed Medvedev and No. 4 seed Tsitsipas met in the semifinals. A rematch of their 2021 semifinal that Medvedev won in straight sets, both players received fines from the ATP due to their behaviour during the match. Medvedev was fined A$12,000 (US$9,022.56) for unsportsmanlike conduct toward chair umpire Jaume Campistol. During a changeover in the second set, after dropping his serve with a double fault, Medvedev erupted in frustration, yelling repeatedly at the umpire, "His father can talk every point? Bro, are you stupid? His father can talk every point?! ... Can his father talk every point?!" He later called Campistol a "small cat" for not citing his opponent for on-court coaching. Tsitsipas's father Apostolos, who often gets coaching warnings at his son's matches, was in fact shouting finable advice (in Greek) from the player's box, something tournament officials eventually laid bare in the fourth set in a "sting operation" using Greek umpire Eva Asderaki-Moore. Tsitsipas failed to win another game after he was given a coaching warning and fined A$5,000 (US$3,759.4). Medvedev managed to dial in on return as the match went on, winning 7–6^{(7–5)}, 4–6, 6–4, 6–1.

Postmatch, Medvedev regretted his reaction to the umpire, saying "I think we can say it was funny, but I was definitely out of my mind".

=== 2022 Cincinnati Masters semifinal ===
Tsitsipas beat Medvedev at the 2022 Cincinnati Masters semifinals. Tsitsipas won the first set in a close tiebreak. Medvedev answered back with a 6–3 scoreline in the second set, before Tsitsipas also took the third set with the same scoreline, winning the match. The scoreline was 7–6^{(8–6)}, 3–6, 6–3. It was his second hardcourt win over Medvedev. Tsitsipas used an all-court game and approached the net plenty to overcome the Russian's deep-lying defensive game. Tsitsipas would ultimately lose to Borna Ćorić in the final in straight sets.

=== 2022 ATP Finals round-robin ===
Though neither would ultimately make it out of the group stage, Medvedev and Tsitsipas faced off in a win-or-go-home match at the 2022 ATP Finals. After Tsitsipas took the first set relatively comfortably, Medvedev saved three match points in a "dramatic" second-set tiebreaker that he captured on his own fourth set point. However, up a break at the end of the third set, Medvedev failed to serve out the match, partly due to an untimely pair of double faults, and Tsitsipas cruised through the decisive tiebreaker, winning 6–3, 6–7^{(11–13)}, 7–6^{(7–1)}.

=== 2023 Italian Open semifinal ===
At the start of the tournament, a fan shared a video showing Medvedev and Tsitsipas passing on a narrow walkway, appearing not to acknowledge each other. They would go on to face each other in the semifinal. During the match, Tsitsipas got into a verbal altercation with his mother, Julia Apostoli, as she was shouting coaching advice to him in Russian. As a result of their disagreement, Apostoli left Tsitsipas’s designated box and went to sit in the stands behind Medvedev’s box. After winning the match 7–5, 7–5, Medvedev did a dance in celebration, reminiscent of Tsitsipas’s celebration after his win over Medvedev in Cincinnati. When asked about this celebration in an interview following the match, Tsitsipas said, "[It] was fun. I wasn’t mad or upset or anything regarding that. I did the same a few months ago". In the same interview, he went on to compliment Medvedev, saying, "The consistency and the power that he was able to put out there [...] he gave me a fresh idea of who he now is on this surface".

== Relationship ==
Following their acrimonious match in Miami in 2018, Tsitsipas's mother said in an interview: "It was just a tense moment, it wasn't personal. Our families are very close. In fact, Daniil's parents were in our house two weeks ago for dinner. Stefanos has nothing against Russia". She later said both players have "room to grow".

In August 2018, after his victory over Tsitsipas at the US Open, Medvedev said, "We didn't speak after Miami ... but it's OK, I understand sometimes there are emotions on court. He blocked me on Instagram, it's strange, but even today he told me 'congrats'. There is no conflict between us, our parents are friends ... I think he wasn't right that time, and when I'm not right I apologize, but he didn't." After defeating Tsitsipas in Basel in October 2018, Medvedev posted a photo to his Instagram account with the caption, "Oops, I did it again".

Tsitsipas said of Medvedev in 2019, "Our chemistry definitely isn’t the best that you can find on the tour ... It's not that I hate him [but] we will not go to dinner together". Medvedev has since said of Tsitsipas, "I think we respect each other as players but probably not so much on personal level ... We don't have any sort of relationship at all, I would say". Alexander Zverev, a generational rival of both players, said in 2019 that Medvedev and Tsitsipas have a "weird" relationship.

After sharing a flight to Washington, D.C. with Tsitsipas and Nick Kyrgios, Medvedev was asked about Tsitsipas, to which he replied, "We don't have a relationship, if I can answer like this. I'm not talking about ... I mean, tough to say. As I always said, I'm not enemies with him, but we're definitely not friends".

Shortly afterwards in August 2019, Tsitsipas said that he found Medvedev uncomfortable to play against, describing his style as "very sloppy, but a good sloppy". Following their 2019 Shanghai match in October, Tsitsipas called Medvedev's game "so boring". When Medvedev defeated Tsitsipas in the 2021 Australian Open, Tsitsipas described Medvedvev as "a player who has unlocked pretty much everything in the game ... He tricks you. You know, he plays the game really smart. It's really interesting to see that". Tsitsipas expressed some optimism about Medvedev's ability to win the entire tournament, saying that a win for Medvedev would be "good for tennis". He took back his previous assessment of Medvedev: "Might have said in the past that he plays boring, but I don't really think he plays boring. He just plays extremely smart and outplays you". When Medvedev reached the world No. 2 ranking in March 2021, Tsitsipas found it "very inspiring" and "important for the game".

Tsitsipas called his first win over Medvedev, at the 2019 ATP Finals, "one of the most important victories of [his] career so far" and said that it meant "more than extra" to him. Upon defeating Medvedev in June 2021, Tsitsipas praised Medvedev as "one of the best guys on tour". Of his defeat, Medvedev said he "didn't expect such a great level from [Tsitsipas]" and that their match was "definitely the match of the day".

Prior to the 2021 Laver Cup, Tsitsipas called Medvedev the "best player at the moment", though he added: "I would not say Medvedev's game is boring; I would say it is one-dimensional. It surprises me that, with that kind of tennis, he manages to achieve what he has achieved". Their relationship "thawed" over time and "kind of got better" after they were teammates at the 2021 Laver Cup.

In January 2022, at the Australian Open, Medvedev lost his temper at the umpire due to Tsitsipas’s coach and father, Apostolos Tsitsipas, talking frequently between points. (It was not the first time Medvedev had expressed his displeasure with Tsitsipas for receiving coaching; he made the same complaint during their 2021 Australian Open match.) When asked about Medvedev's outburst, Tsitsipas said, "It's funny. I don’t pay attention to the stuff ... He's not the most mature person anyways". After the match, Medvedev said "It all started in Miami" and "Every match against Stefanos is kind of special", though in another interview, he said that his outburst was about the coaching, and not something personal against his opponent.

Things remained strained when Tsitsipas was defeated by Andrey Rublev in the 2022 ATP Finals. Tsitsipas described himself as being a better player than Rublev, and that Rublev had "prevailed with the few tools that he has", though he later apologized. Medvedev is a close friend of Rublev. After winning the 2023 title in Dubai, Medvedev addressed the insults towards Rublev in his victory speech, though he did not mention Tsitsipas by name: "Not long ago one player says that [Rublev] has just a few weapons and I was reading this interview and I was like how can you say this? [...] Hopefully, he can beat this guy who said it many, many times. I wish this for sure".

Tsitsipas has since said that he finds Medvedev's antics on court funny at times, as well as praising Medvedev's unorthodox plays and his inside-out backhand. Medvedev also complimented Tsitsipas's one-handed backhand in 2023.

== Head-to-head ==
Legend	Medvedev	Tsitsipas
Grand Slam	3	1
Tour Finals	0	2
Masters 1000	6	1
ATP 500	2	1
Total	11	5

=== Singles (16) ===
Medvedev 11 – Tsitsipas 5

No.	Year	Tournament	Tier	Surface	Round	Winner	Score	Length	Sets	Medvedev	Tsitsipas
1	2018	Miami Open	Masters 1000	Hard	Round of 128	Medvedev	2–6, 6–4, 6–2	1:52	3/3	1	0
2	2018	US Open	Grand Slam	Hard	Round of 64	Medvedev	6–4, 6–3, 4–6, 6–3	2:48	4/5	2	0
3	2018	Swiss Indoors	ATP 500	Hard (i)	Quarterfinals	Medvedev	6–4, 3–6, 6–3	1:50	3/3	3	0
4	2019	Monte-Carlo Masters	Masters 1000	Clay	Round of 16	Medvedev	6–2, 1–6, 6–4	1:45	3/3	4	0
5	2019	Shanghai Masters	Masters 1000	Hard	Semifinals	Medvedev	7–6^{(7–5)}, 7–5	1:36	2/3	5	0
6	2019	ATP Finals	Tour Finals	Hard (i)	Round Robin	Tsitsipas	7–6^{(7–5)}, 6–4	1:42	2/3	5	1
7	2021	Australian Open	Grand Slam	Hard	Semifinals	Medvedev	6–4, 6–2, 7–5	2:09	3/5	6	1
8	2021	French Open	Grand Slam	Clay	Quarterfinals	Tsitsipas	6–3, 7–6^{(7–3)}, 7–5	2:19	3/5	6	2
9	2022	Australian Open	Grand Slam	Hard	Semifinals	Medvedev	7–6^{(7–5)}, 4–6, 6–4, 6–1	2:30	4/5	7	2
10	2022	Cincinnati Masters	Masters 1000	Hard	Semifinals	Tsitsipas	7–6^{(8–6)}, 3–6, 6–3	2:23	3/3	7	3
11	2022	ATP Finals	Tour Finals	Hard (i)	Round Robin	Tsitsipas	6–3, 6–7^{(11–13)}, 7–6^{(7–1)}	2:21	3/3	7	4
12	2023	Italian Open	Masters 1000	Clay	Semifinals	Medvedev	7–5, 7–5	1:47	2/3	8	4
13	2023	Vienna Open	ATP 500	Hard (i)	Semifinals	Medvedev	6–4, 7–6^{(8–6)}	1:44	2/3	9	4
14	2024	Shanghai Masters	Masters 1000	Hard	Round of 16	Medvedev	7–6^{(7–3)}, 6–3	1:50	2/3	10	4
15	2026	Qatar Open	ATP 500	Hard	Round of 16	Tsitsipas	6–3, 6–4	1:16	2/3	10	5
16	2026	Shanghai Masters	Masters 1000	Hard	Round of 16	Medvedev	6–4, 7–5	1:24	2/3	11	5

== See also ==
- List of tennis rivalries
- Medvedev–Zverev rivalry
