= Medvedev–Zverev rivalry =

ATP tennis rivalry

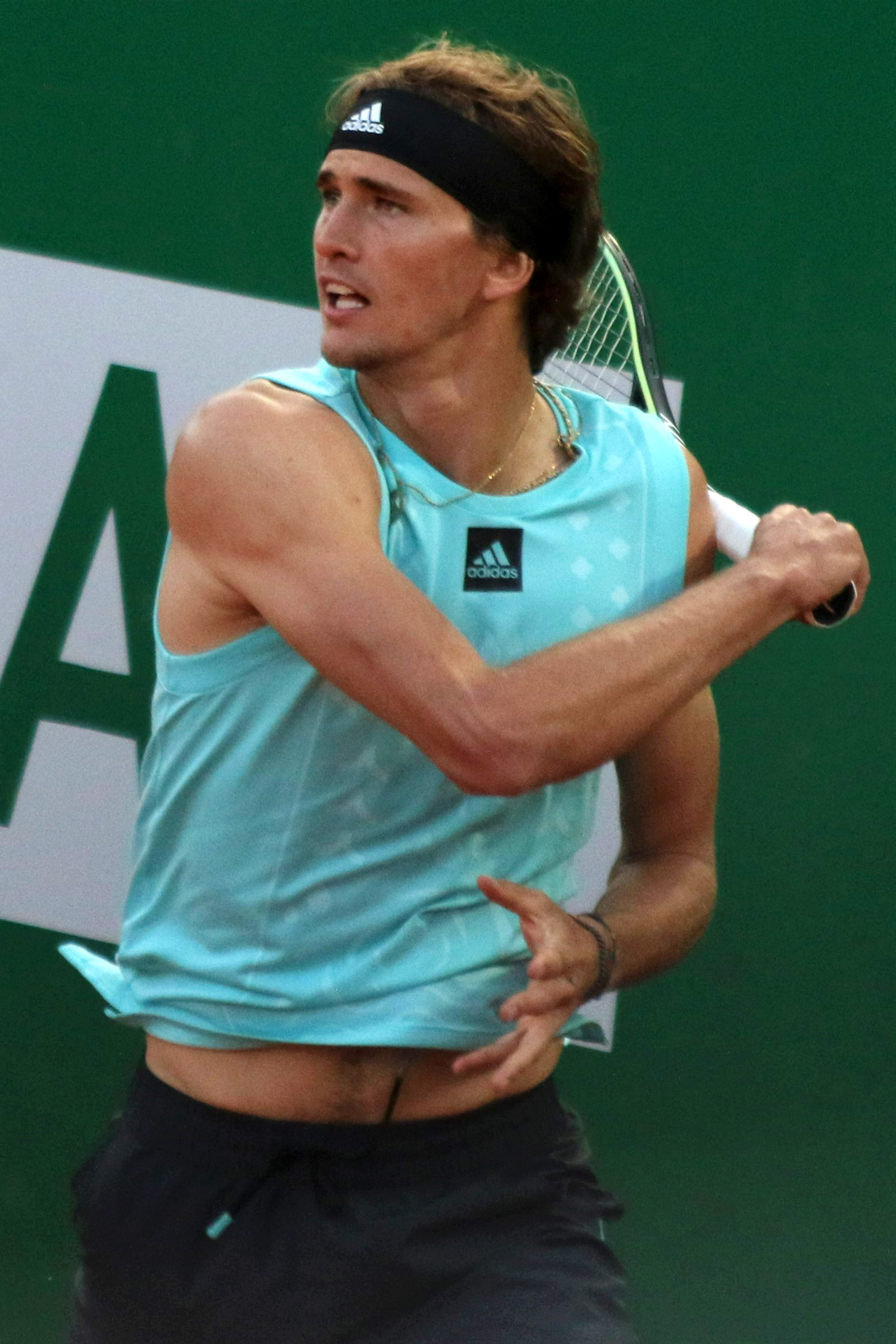
Alexander Zverev

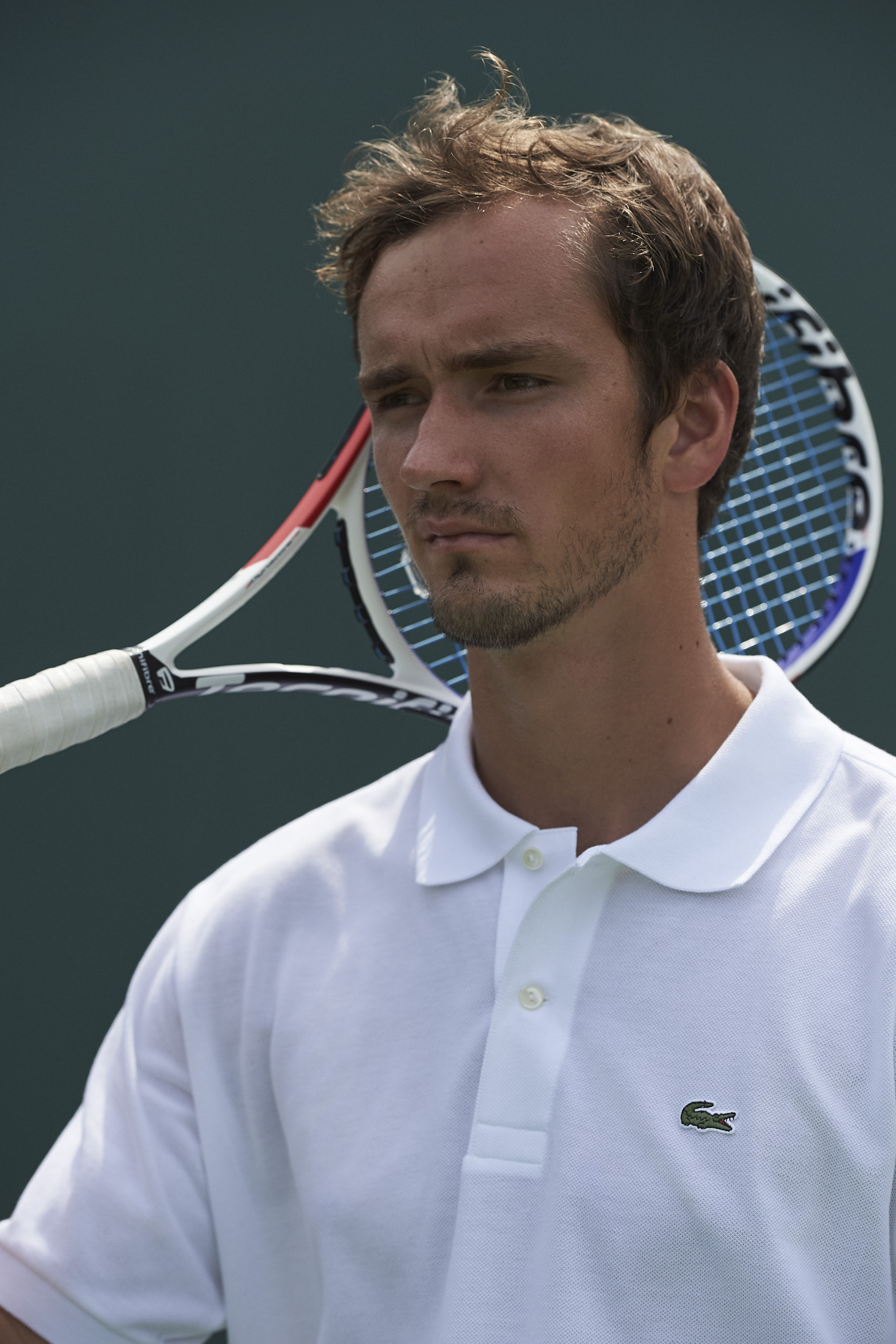
Daniil Medvedev

Association of Tennis Professionals (ATP) players Daniil Medvedev and Alexander Zverev have faced each other 23 times since 2016, with Medvedev leading the rivalry, 14–9. Medvedev leads their five-set record at 1–0.

In July 2022, after the 2022 Wimbledon Championships, Medvedev reclaimed the world number 1 ranking whilst Zverev reached a new career high ranking of world No. 2, thus ending the Big Three's streak in the top 2 spots since 10 November 2003. At 6 ft 6 (198 cm) tall each, they are the two tallest men to ever hold the top two rankings. Their most notable match was played in the semifinals of the 2024 Australian Open, which Medvedev won in five-sets.

== Notable matches ==
=== 2019 Shanghai Masters final ===
In their first Masters 1000 final against each other, Medvedev triumphed 6–4, 6–1. After the defeat, Zverev called Medvedev, who reached his sixth consecutive final and fourth consecutive big title final, "the best player in the world right now".

=== 2021 ATP Tour Finals final ===
Zverev defeated defending champion Medvedev in the final, 6–4, 6–4 to win the singles tennis title at the 2021 ATP Finals. He ended a five-match losing streak to Medvedev dating back to the 2020 Paris Masters.

=== 2023 Indian Wells fourth round ===
The 2023 Indian Wells fourth round was named as one of the top 5 ATP Matches of the Year in 2023. After losing the first set in a 5–7 tiebreak, Medvedev won the second set tiebreak 7–5 and won the match 7–5 in the third set after the ball bounced off the net cord into Zverev's side, where he shot the ball wide into an out, ending the match. This also caused Medvedev to move ahead of Zverev in their rivalry, pulling ahead 7–6.

=== 2024 Australian Open semifinal ===
Medvedev defeated Zverev in 2024 Australian Open semifinals, 5–7, 3–6, 7–6^{(7–4)}, 7–6^{(7–5)}, 6–3, coming from two sets down. It was their first ever meeting at a Grand Slam.

== Head-to-head ==
Legend	Medvedev	Zverev
Grand Slam	1	0
Tour Finals	3	3
Masters 1000	6	4
ATP 500	3	1
ATP 250	0	1
ATP Cup	1	0
Total	14	9

=== Singles (23) ===
Medvedev 14 – Zverev 9

No.	Year	Tournament	Tier	Surface	Round	Winner	Score	Length	Sets	Medvedev	Zverev
1.	2016	St. Petersburg Open	ATP 250	Hard (i)	Round of 16	Zverev	6–3, 7–5	1:26	2/3	0	1
2.	2017	Washington Open	ATP 500	Hard	Quarterfinals	Zverev	6–2, 6–4	0:58	2/3	0	2
3.	2018	Miami Open	Masters 1000	Hard	Round of 64	Zverev	6–4, 1–6, 7–6^{(7–5)}	2:13	3/3	0	3
4.	2018	Canadian Open	Masters 1000	Hard	Round of 16	Zverev	6–3, 6–2	0:53	2/3	0	4
5.	2019	Shanghai Masters	Masters 1000	Hard	Final	Medvedev	6–4, 6–1	1:14	2/3	1	4
6.	2019	ATP Finals	Tour Finals	Hard (i)	Round Robin	Zverev	6–4, 7–6^{(7–4)}	1:18	2/3	1	5
7.	2020	Paris Masters	Masters 1000	Hard (i)	Final	Medvedev	5–7, 6–4, 6–1	2:07	3/3	2	5
8.	2020	ATP Finals	Tour Finals	Hard (i)	Round Robin	Medvedev	6–3, 6–4	1:29	2/3	3	5
9.	2021	ATP Cup	ATP Cup	Hard	Semifinals	Medvedev	3–6, 6–3, 7–5	2:38	3/3	4	5
10.	2021	Paris Masters	Masters 1000	Hard (i)	Semifinals	Medvedev	6–2, 6–2	1:21	2/3	5	5
11.	2021	ATP Finals	Tour Finals	Hard (i)	Round Robin	Medvedev	6–3, 6–7^{(3–7)}, 7–6^{(8–6)}	2:36	3/3	6	5
12.	2021	ATP Finals	Tour Finals	Hard (i)	Final	Zverev	6–4, 6–4	1:15	2/3	6	6
13.	2023	Indian Wells Masters	Masters 1000	Hard	Round of 16	Medvedev	6–7^{(5–7)}, 7–6^{(7–5)}, 7–5	3:17	3/3	7	6
14.	2023	Monte-Carlo Masters	Masters 1000	Clay	Round of 16	Medvedev	3–6, 7–5, 7–6^{(9–7)}	3:05	3/3	8	6
15.	2023	Italian Open	Masters 1000	Clay	Round of 16	Medvedev	6–2, 7–6^{(7–3)}	1:56	2/3	9	6
16.	2023	Cincinnati Open	Masters 1000	Hard	Round of 16	Zverev	6–4, 5–7, 6–4	2:33	3/3	9	7
17.	2023	China Open	ATP 500	Hard	Semifinals	Medvedev	6–4, 6–3	1:26	2/3	10	7
18.	2023	ATP Finals	Tour Finals	Hard (i)	Round Robin	Medvedev	7–6^{(9–7)}, 6–4	1:46	2/3	11	7
19.	2024	Australian Open	Grand Slam	Hard	Semifinals	Medvedev	5–7, 3–6, 7–6^{(7–4)}, 7–6^{(7–5)}, 6–3	4:18	5/5	12	7
20.	2025	Halle Open	ATP 500	Grass	Semifinals	Medvedev	7–6^{(7–3)}, 6–7^{(1–7)}, 6–4	2:59	3/3	13	7
21.	2025	China Open	ATP 500	Hard	Quarterfinals	Medvedev	6–3, 6–3	1:22	2/3	14	7
22.	2025	Paris Masters	Masters 1000	Hard (i)	Quarterfinals	Zverev	2–6, 6–3, 7–6^{(7–5)}	2:30	3/3	14	8
23.	2026	ATP Finals	Tour Finals	Hard (i)	Semifinal	Zverev	7–6^{(7–0)}, 6–4	1:26	2/3	14	9

== See also ==
- List of tennis rivalries
- Medvedev–Tsitsipas rivalry
