= Marathea, Karditsa =

Marathea Μαραθέα
- Community
- Location within Greece
- Coordinates: 39°32′N 22°0′E
- Country: Greece
- Administrative region: Thessaly
- Regional unit: Karditsa
- Municipality: Palamas
- Municipal unit: Sellana

Population (2021)
  - Community: 692
- Time zone: UTC+2 (EET)
  - Summer (DST): UTC+3 (EEST)
- Vehicle registration: ΚΑ

Marathea (Greek: Μαραθέα, before 1957: Βάναρη - Vanari) is a village and a community in the municipal unit of Sellana, Karditsa regional unit, Greece. It is situated in a flat rural area on the right bank of the river Pineios, where cotton is cultivated. It is 9 km southwest of Farkadona, 10 km northwest of Palamas, 19 km northeast of Karditsa and 20 km east of Trikala. The community Marathea includes the village Korda.

== Population ==
Year	Village population	Community population
1981	-	1,032
1991	761	-
2001	709	967
2011	655	901
2021	505	692

== See also ==
- List of settlements in the Karditsa regional unit
