= Proastio, Karditsa =

Proastio Προάστιο
- Community
- Location within Greece
- Coordinates: 39°29′N 21°54′E
- Country: Greece
- Administrative region: Thessaly
- Regional unit: Karditsa
- Municipality: Palamas
- Municipal unit: Sellana

Population (2021)
  - Community: 1,434
- Time zone: UTC+2 (EET)
  - Summer (DST): UTC+3 (EEST)
- Vehicle registration: ΚΑ

Proastio (Greek: Προάστιο, before 1962: Παραπράσταινα - Paraprastaina) is a Greek village in the northern part of the Karditsa regional unit, Greece. Proastio was the seat of the former municipality Sellana. It is located in a flat rural area, near the right bank of the river Pineios. It is 14 km north of Karditsa and 14 km southeast of Trikala.

== Population ==
Historical population
Year	Pop.	±%
1981	1,901	—
1991	2,012	+5.8%
2001	1,828	−9.1%
2011	1,666	−8.9%
2021	1,434	−13.9%

== Famous people ==
- Apostolos Tsitsipas
- Petros Tsitsipas
- Stefanos Tsitsipas

== See also ==
- List of settlements in the Karditsa regional unit
