= Sellana =

Sellana Σέλλανα
- Municipal unit
- Location within the regional unit

- Location within Greece
- Coordinates: 39°29′N 21°54′E
- Country: Greece
- Administrative region: Thessaly
- Regional unit: Karditsa
- Municipality: Palamas

Area
  - Municipal unit: 89.5 km^{2} (34.6 sq mi)

Population (2021)
  - Municipal unit: 3,654
  - Municipal unit density: 40.8/km^{2} (106/sq mi)
- Time zone: UTC+2 (EET)
  - Summer (DST): UTC+3 (EEST)
- Vehicle registration: ΚΑ

Sellana (Greek: Σέλλανα) is a former municipality in the Karditsa regional unit, Thessaly, Greece, named after the ancient city of "Sellana" or "Silàna". Since the 2011 local government reform it is part of the municipality Palamas, of which it is a municipal unit. The municipal unit has an area of 89.490 km^{2}. The seat of the municipality was in Proastio, which has 1,434 inhabitants (2021). Other communities in the municipal unit are those of Marathea (pop. 692), Agia Triada (548), Pedino (505) and Kalogriana (475).

== Subdivisions ==
The municipal unit Sellana is subdivided into the following communities (constituent villages in brackets):

- Agia Triada
- Kalogriana
- Marathea (Marathea, Korda)
- Pedino
- Proastio

== Population ==
Historical population
Year	Pop.	±%
2001	4,987	—
2011	4,551	−8.7%
2021	3,654	−19.7%
