= 2016 St. Petersburg Open – Singles =

Singles
- 2016 St. Petersburg Open

Final
- Champion: (Germany) Alexander Zverev
- Runner-up: (Switzerland) Stan Wawrinka
- Score: 6–2, 3–6, 7–5

Events
Singles	Doubles
- St. Petersburg Open

Milos Raonic was the defending champion, but lost in the second round to Mikhail Youzhny.

Alexander Zverev won his first ATP title, defeating Stan Wawrinka in the final, 6–2, 3–6, 7–5.

This tournament was also notable for the first match played between Zverev and Daniil Medvedev, who would go on to play a total of 22 ATP Tour-level matches against each other; Zverev won their second-round encounter.

== Seeds ==
The top four seeds receive a bye into the second round.

1. (Switzerland) Stan Wawrinka (final)
2. (Canada) Milos Raonic (second round)
3. (Czech Republic) Tomáš Berdych (semifinals)
4. (Spain) Roberto Bautista Agut (semifinals)
5. (Germany) Alexander Zverev (champion)
6. (Spain) Albert Ramos Viñolas (first round)
7. (Serbia) Viktor Troicki (quarterfinals)
8. (Portugal) João Sousa (quarterfinals)

== Draw ==
Key

- Q = Qualifier
- WC = Wild card
- LL = Lucky loser
- Alt = Alternate
- ITF = ITF entry
- PR = Protected ranking
- SR = Special ranking
- SE = Special exempt
- JE = Junior exempt
- JR = Junior Accelerator Programme entrant
- CO = College Accelerator Programme entrant
- NG = Next Gen Accelerator Program entrant
- w/o = Walkover
- r = Retired
- d = Defaulted

=== Finals ===
Semifinals
1	(Switzerland) Stan Wawrinka	7^{10}	6
4	(Spain) Roberto Bautista Agut	6^{8}	2
3	(Czech Republic) Tomáš Berdych	4	4
5	(Germany) Alexander Zverev	6	6

Final
1	(Switzerland) Stan Wawrinka	2	6	5
5	(Germany) Alexander Zverev	6	3	7

=== Top half ===
First round
(Argentina) D Schwartzman	4	4
(Czech Republic) L Rosol	6	6
(Serbia) D Lajović	2	6	6
(Spain) F Verdasco	6	3	2
(Portugal) G Elias	1	2
7	(Serbia) V Troicki	6	6
(France) A Mannarino	6^{7}	6	3
(Lithuania) R Berankis	7^{9}	3	6
WC	(Russia) A Rublev	6	4
(Kazakhstan) M Kukushkin	3	1^{r}
Q	(Moldova) R Albot	6	4	5
8	(Portugal) J Sousa	3	6	7

Second round
1	(Switzerland) S Wawrinka	6	6
(Czech Republic) L Rosol	3	1
(Serbia) D Lajović	4	4
7	(Serbia) V Troicki	6	6
4	(Spain) R Bautista Agut	4	6	7^{7}
(Lithuania) R Berankis	6	1	6^{2}
WC	(Russia) A Rublev	6^{3}	6	3
8	(Portugal) J Sousa	7^{7}	3	6

Quarterfinals
1	(Switzerland) S Wawrinka	7	6
7	(Serbia) V Troicki	5	2
4	(Spain) R Bautista Agut	4	6	6
8	(Portugal) J Sousa	6	1	2

Semifinals
1	(Switzerland) S Wawrinka	7^{10}	6
4	(Spain) R Bautista Agut	6^{8}	2

=== Bottom half ===
First round
6	(Spain) A Ramos Viñolas	5	2
Q	(France) A Sidorenko	7	6
Q	(Germany) M Zverev	6	6^{6}	0
(Italy) P Lorenzi	3	7^{8}	6
(Russia) E Donskoy	3	5
(Russia) A Kuznetsov	6	7
5	(Germany) A Zverev	7^{7}	6
WC	(Russia) K Khachanov	6^{3}	4
Q	(Russia) D Medvedev	6	6
WC	(Russia) A Bublik	4	0
PR	(Serbia) J Tipsarević	3	5
(Russia) M Youzhny	6	7

Second round
Q	(France) A Sidorenko	6^{6}	4
(Italy) P Lorenzi	7^{8}	6
(Russia) A Kuznetsov	3	6	6^{4}
3	(Czech Republic) T Berdych	6	2	7^{7}
5	(Germany) A Zverev	6	7
Q	(Russia) D Medvedev	3	5
(Russia) M Youzhny	2	7^{8}	6
2	(Canada) M Raonic	6	6^{6}	4

Quarterfinals
(Italy) P Lorenzi	4	3
3	(Czech Republic) T Berdych	6	6
5	(Germany) A Zverev	6	6
(Russia) M Youzhny	2	2

Semifinals
3	(Czech Republic) T Berdych	4	4
5	(Germany) A Zverev	6	6

== Qualifying ==
=== Seeds ===
1. (Moldova) Radu Albot (qualified)
2. (Russia) Teymuraz Gabashvili (qualifying competition)
3. (Germany) Mischa Zverev (qualified)
4. (Russia) Daniil Medvedev (qualified)
5. (Russia) Alexander Kudryavtsev (qualifying competition)
6. (United Kingdom) James Ward (first round)
7. (France) Alexandre Sidorenko (qualified)
8. (Czech Republic) Jan Mertl (qualifying competition)

=== Qualifiers ===
1. (Moldova) Radu Albot
2. (France) Alexandre Sidorenko
3. (Germany) Mischa Zverev
4. (Russia) Daniil Medvedev

=== Qualifying draw ===
==== First qualifier ====
First round
1	(Moldova) Radu Albot	6	4	6
(Belarus) Dzmitry Zhyrmont	2	6	4
PR	(Serbia) Nikola Ćaćić	4	3
8	(Czech Republic) Jan Mertl	6	6

Qualifying competition
1	(Moldova) Radu Albot	6	6
8	(Czech Republic) Jan Mertl	3	4

==== Second qualifier ====
First round
2	(Russia) Teymuraz Gabashvili	6	4	6
WC	(Russia) Mikhail Elgin	2	6	3
Alt	(Russia) Evgenii Tiurnev	4	3
7	(France) Alexandre Sidorenko	6	6

Qualifying competition
2	(Russia) Teymuraz Gabashvili	4	4
7	(France) Alexandre Sidorenko	6	6

==== Third qualifier ====
First round
3	(Germany) Mischa Zverev	6	6
WC	(Russia) Maxim Kravtsov	3	0
(Poland) Michał Przysiężny	3	3
5	(Russia) Alexander Kudryavtsev	6	6

Qualifying competition
3	(Germany) Mischa Zverev	6	2	6
5	(Russia) Alexander Kudryavtsev	1	6	3

==== Fourth qualifier ====
First round
4	(Russia) Daniil Medvedev	6	6^{1}	7
(Russia) Alexey Vatutin	3	7^{7}	5
(Croatia) Ante Pavić	7^{7}	6
6	(United Kingdom) James Ward	6^{3}	2

Qualifying competition
4	(Russia) Daniil Medvedev	6	6
(Croatia) Ante Pavić	4	2
