= Stefanos Tsitsipas =

Greek tennis player (born 1998)

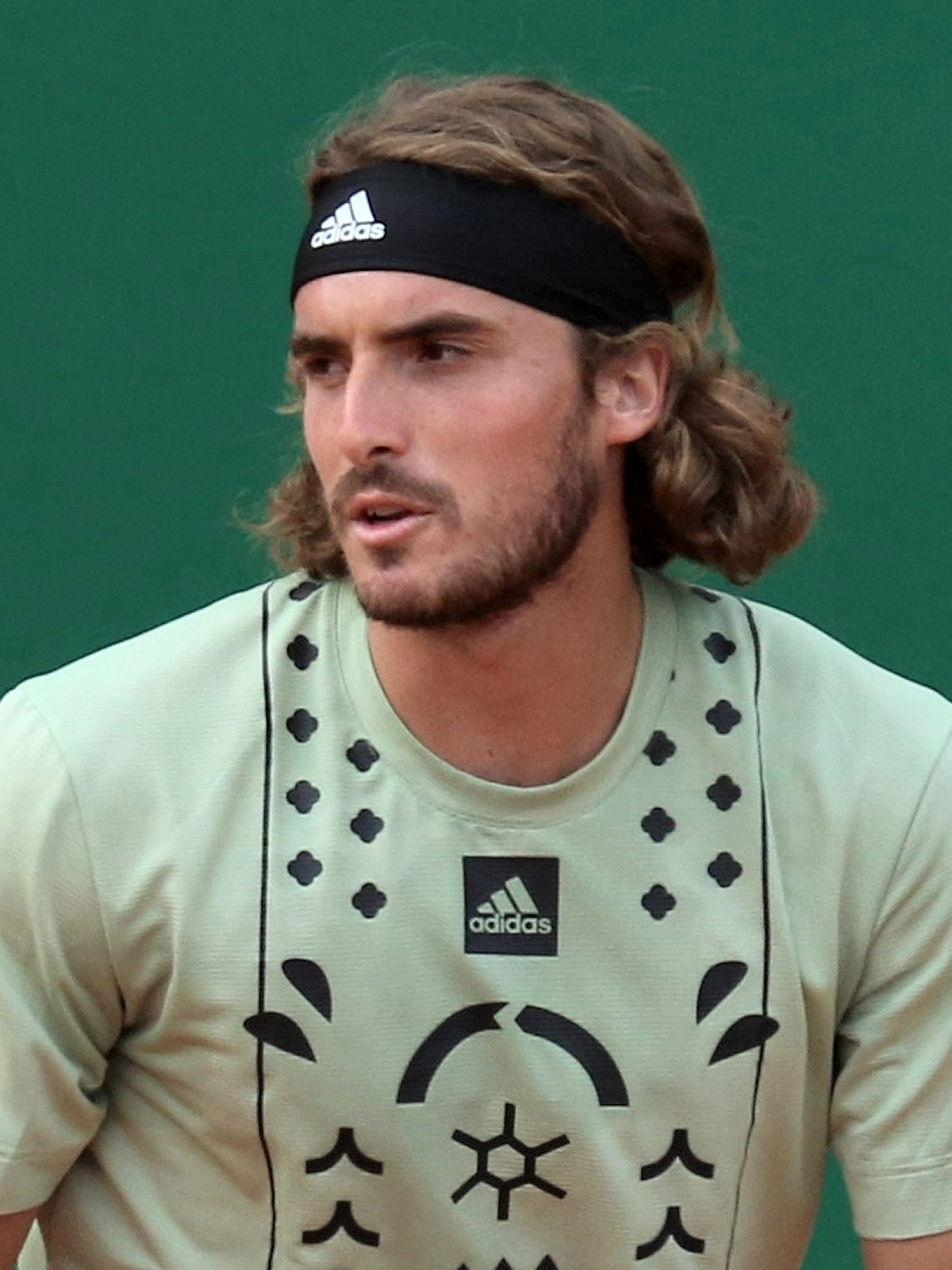
- Country (sports): Greece
- Residence: Monte Carlo
- Born: 12 August 1998 (age 28) Athens, Greece
- Height: 1.93 m (6 ft 4 in)
- Turned pro: 2016
- Plays: Right-handed (one-handed backhand)
- Coach: Apostolos Tsitsipas (2001–2024, 2025–2026); Dimitris Chatzinikolaou (2024–2025); Goran Ivanišević (2025); Thomas Perrin (2026–)
- Prize money: US $39,841,492: 10th all-time in earnings
- Official website: www.tsitsipas.com

Singles
- Career record: 404–206 (Note: in ATP Tour and Grand Slam main draw matches, and in Davis Cup)
- Career titles: 13
- Highest ranking: No. 3 (9 August 2021)
- Current ranking: No. 36 (9 November 2026)

Grand Slam singles results
- Australian Open: F (2023)
- French Open: F (2021)
- Wimbledon: 4R (2018, 2023)
- US Open: 4R (2026)

Other tournaments
- Tour Finals: W (2019)
- Olympic Games: QF (2024)

Doubles
- Career record: 49–84
- Career titles: 2
- Highest ranking: No. 64 (29 August 2022)
- Current ranking: No. 260 (26 October 2026)

Grand Slam doubles results
- Australian Open: 2R (2023)
- French Open: QF (2024)
- Wimbledon: 1R (2018, 2021, 2023, 2024)
- US Open: 2R (2018, 2023)

Other doubles tournaments
- Olympic Games: 1R (2024)

Grand Slam mixed doubles results
- French Open: 1R (2024)
- US Open: 1R (2024)

Other mixed doubles tournaments
- Olympic Games: QF (2020)

Team competitions
- Davis Cup: WGI (2023, 2024, 2025)
- Hopman Cup: RR (2019, 2025)
- Last updated on: 26 October 2026.

Stefanos Tsitsipas (Greek: Στέφανος Τσιτσιπάς, pronounced [ˈstefanos t͡sit͡siˈpas]; born 12 August 1998) is a Greek professional tennis player. He has been ranked as high as world No. 3 in men's singles by the Association of Tennis Professionals (ATP), first achieved in August 2021, making him the highest-ranked Greek male tennis player. Tsitsipas has won 13 ATP Tour singles titles, including the 2019 ATP Finals and three Masters 1000 events. He has finished runner-up at two majors, at the 2021 French Open and 2023 Australian Open.

Born into a tennis family—his mother Julia was a professional on the WTA Tour and his father Apostolos trained as a tennis coach—Tsitsipas was a junior world No. 1, and won the 2016 Wimbledon boys' doubles event. In 2018, he won his first ATP Tour title, the Next Gen ATP Finals, and was runner-up at the 2018 Canadian Open. From 2019 to 2024, Tsitsipas remained an almost constant fixture in the top 10 of the ATP rankings. During this time, he won three Masters 1000 titles at the Monte-Carlo Masters (in 2021, 2022, and 2024). He also contested two major finals, losing both to Novak Djokovic. Since 2024, Tsitsipas has struggled with injury and inconsistent form, and has been ranked outside the top 20. He was named the Greek Male Athlete of the Year for 2019.

== Early life and background ==
Tsitsipas was born on 12 August 1998 to Apostolos Tsitsipas and Julia Apostoli (née Salnikova) in Athens. His father is Greek and was born in Proastio, Karditsa and his mother is Russian of partial Greek heritage. His maternal grandfather, Sergei Salnikov, was a Russian footballer who played for Zenit Leningrad, Spartak Moscow and Dynamo Moscow, as well as the Soviet Union national team. Salnikov was also half Greek. Both of his parents are experienced tennis players, and his mother in particular was a world No. 1 junior who had a career-high professional ranking inside the top 200 and represented the Soviet Union in the Federation Cup. His parents had been working as tennis instructors at the Astir Palace resort hotel in Vouliagmeni at the time of his birth. They originally met at a WTA tournament in Athens where his mother was competing and his father was a line judge. Stefanos has three younger siblings: two brothers Petros and Pavlos, and a sister Elisavet who is the youngest. All of his siblings are also tennis players.

With their strong backgrounds in tennis, Tsitsipas's parents got their oldest son started on tennis at a very young age. Stefanos has said, "My first memory is to be three and to hit balls with my father in the gap between lessons. I remember watching games on TV, as a baby, I can not tell you who was playing, but I remember watching." He also participated in other sports as a kid, including football and swimming. His father said Stefanos made the decision to become a tennis player himself, recalling that his son "woke up in the middle of the night" after a tournament in France at age nine and told him "Dad, I have to tell you something: I want to become a tennis player, I like the competition, I like the challenge."

Tsitsipas began taking lessons at Tennis Club Glyfada near Athens at the age of six, and has continued to train there. His father has mostly served as his primary coach, and he formally studied tennis coaching at the University of Athens to help train his children. In 2015, Tsitsipas also began training at the Mouratoglou Tennis Academy, splitting time between France and Greece during this period.

== Junior career ==
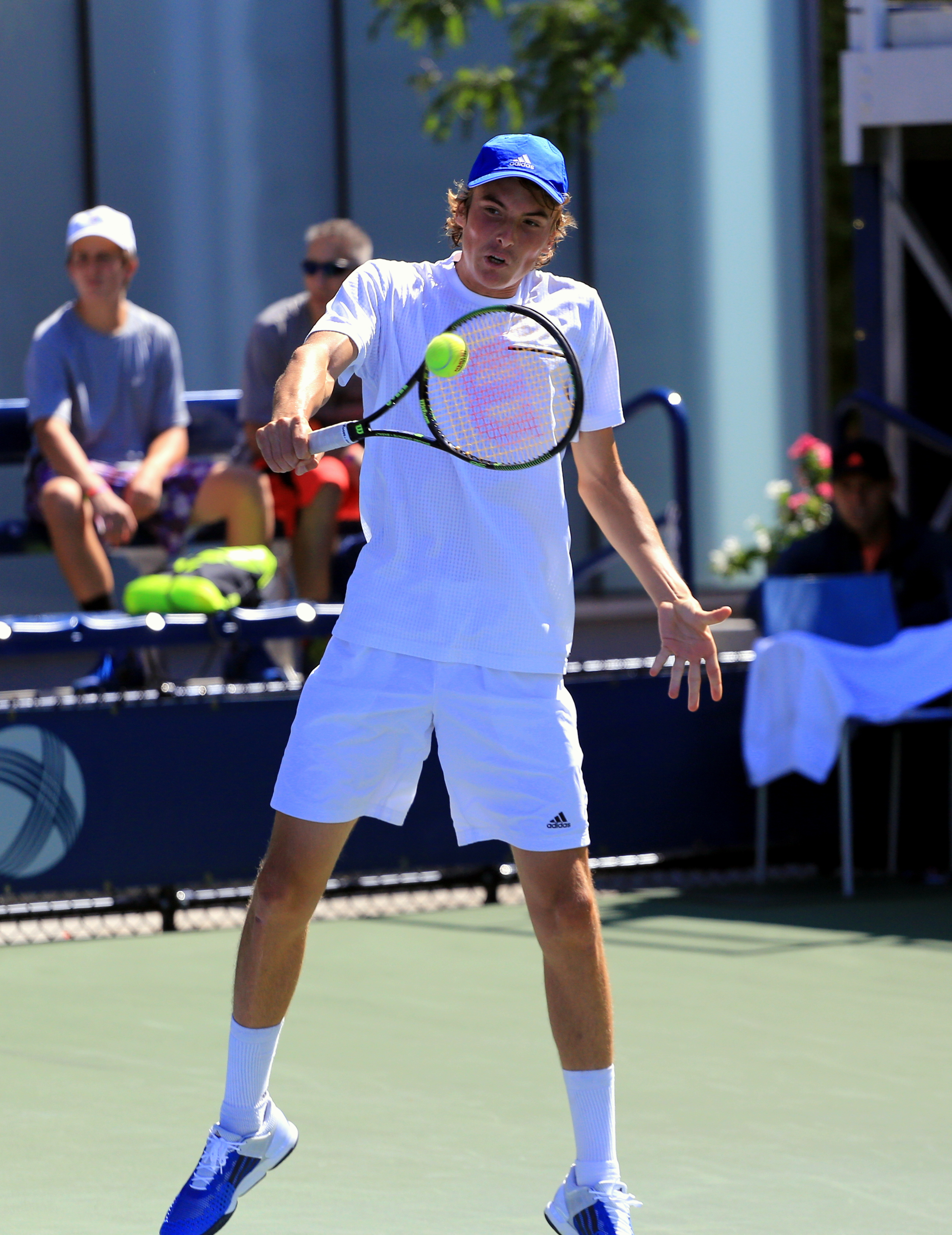
Tsitsipas at the 2015 US Open

Tsitsipas is a former world No. 1 junior. He began playing on the ITF Junior Circuit in 2013 at the age of 14. He did not play in any high-level Grade A tournaments until the Abierto Juvenil Mexicano in November 2014, but was able to make it all the way to the final of his second career Grade A event at the Orange Bowl a month later. Tsitsipas had entered the tournament ranked outside of the top 100 in the junior rankings. In 2015, Tsitsipas got his first opportunity to play in the junior Grand Slam tournaments. In these four events, a quarterfinal at the Australian Open was his best result. He did not win any singles finals that year, but he did have another runner-up finish at the Orange Bowl, this time losing to Miomir Kecmanović in a third set tiebreak. He finished the season as the No. 14 ranked junior in the world.

In 2016, Tsitsipas had a breakout year, reaching at least the quarterfinals of all eight tournaments that he played, including all four Grand Slams. He became the top-ranked junior in the world after winning his first Grade A title at the Trofeo Bonfiglio. Tsitsipas also won the European Junior Championships later in the year. Tsitsipas's biggest title of the season came in doubles, when he partnered with Estonian player Kenneth Raisma to win his only junior Grand Slam event at Wimbledon. He became the first male Greek to win a junior Grand Slam in the Open Era, and the second overall after Nicky Kalogeropoulos won both the French Open and Wimbledon in 1963. Besides his doubles triumph, Tsitsipas also had his two best finishes in the Grand Slam singles events that year, making the semifinals of both Wimbledon and the US Open. He ended the year as the No. 2 ranked junior in the world, behind only Kecmanović who had played several more events.

== Professional career ==
=== 2013–17: Top 100, ATP semifinal, top 10 victory ===
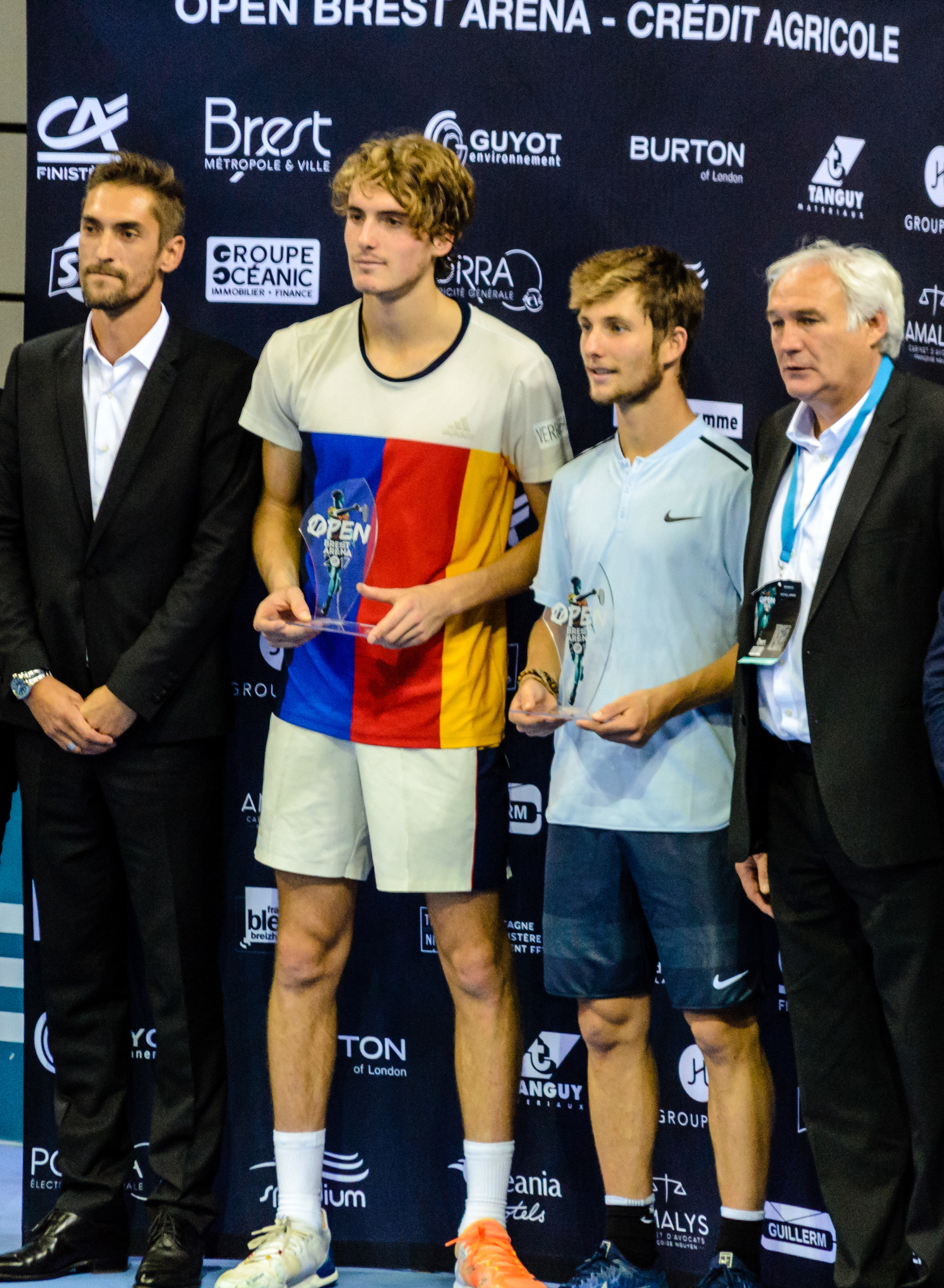
Tsitsipas with the runner-up trophy at the 2017 Brest Challenger

Tsitsipas began playing low-level ITF Futures events in Greece in 2013 shortly after turning 15, not long after he started competing on the junior tour. He qualified for his first event on the ATP Challenger Tour at the Burnie International in early 2015 while still 16 years old, but lost his only main draw match to Benjamin Mitchell. Tsitsipas won his first Futures title later that year and would go on to win a total of eleven such titles, five in singles and six in doubles, through the end of 2016. He also won his first Challenger match near the end of 2015 in Mohammedia in Morocco. Tsitsipas returned to Morocco a year later and reached his first two Challenger finals in back-to-back weeks at Mohammedia and Casablanca. This success in Africa helped him crack the top 200 later that October. Towards the end of that month, Tsitsipas was granted a qualifying wild card into the Swiss Indoors in Basel, his first ATP Tour appearance. He defeated Rajeev Ram in the opening round, but was unable to qualify after a loss to Robin Haase.

Tsitsipas played in his first ATP main draw at the 2017 Rotterdam Open, where he lost his debut match to the eventual champion Jo-Wilfried Tsonga. He also made his Grand Slam debut later that year as a qualifier at the French Open, but lost to Ivo Karlović in his first match. After losing in qualifying at the US Open, Tsitsipas won his first Challenger title in Genova. Overall, he qualified for a tour-best eight events during the season, including Wimbledon and the Shanghai Masters. However, he did not win a tour-level match until the very end of the season when he defeated fellow Next Gen player Karen Khachanov in Shanghai. At the European Open in Belgium the following week, Tsitsipas reached his first ATP semifinal as a qualifier. During the event, he upset hometown favorite and world No. 10 David Goffin for his first career top 10 victory. With this run, Tsitsipas became the first Greek player to be ranked in the top 100 of the ATP rankings, accomplishing the feat at the age of 19 and surpassing Konstantinos Economidis as the highest ranked Greek player. He also reached a ranking high enough to be named an alternate for the Next Gen ATP Finals. Tsitsipas closed out the season with another Challenger final, this time in Brest.

=== 2018: First Masters final, Next Gen champion ===
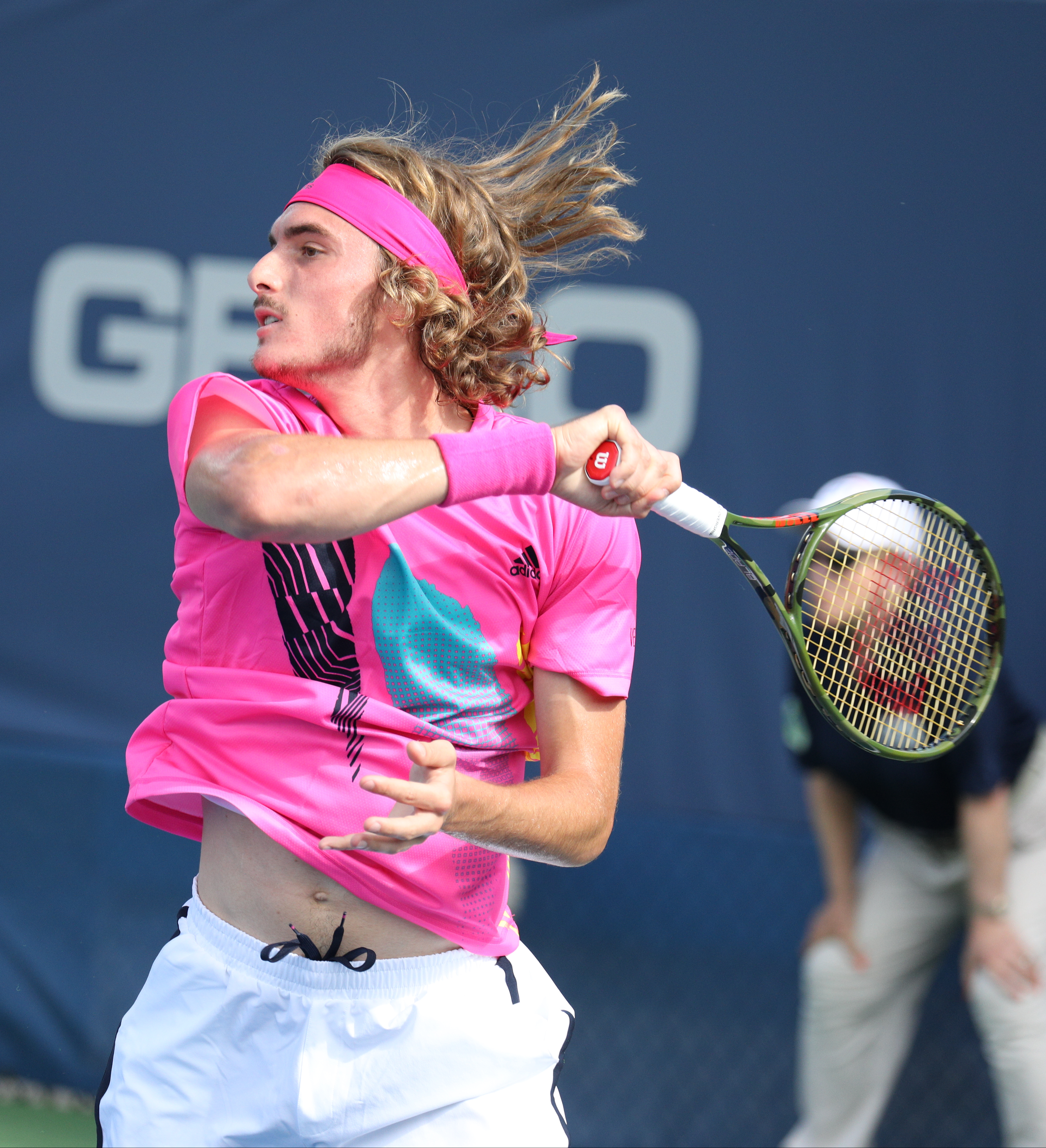
Tsitsipas at the 2018 Washington Open

Tsitsipas started the year at the Qatar Open where he lost in the quarterfinals to world No. 5 Dominic Thiem, again as a qualifier. After losing in the opening round in his Australian Open debut, his best result in the rest of the early-year hard court season was another quarterfinal at the Dubai Tennis Championships. Tsitsipas's first breakthrough of the year came at the Barcelona Open during the clay court season, where he reached his first career ATP final without dropping a set. During the ATP 500 Series tournament, he defeated three top 20 players including No. 7 Thiem, before losing to world No. 1 Rafael Nadal in a lopsided match. With this result, Tsitsipas moved into the top 50 and became the second Greek to reach an ATP final after Nicky Kalogeropoulos in 1973. His performance also gained national attention in Greece, where tennis is not a widely popular sport. The following week at the Estoril Open, he reached another semifinal. He also picked up a third career top ten victory over No. 8 Kevin Anderson.

Tsitsipas closed out the clay court season by winning his first career Grand Slam match at the French Open against Carlos Taberner before losing to Thiem, the eventual runner-up. He played the next Grand Slam at Wimbledon seeded for first time at No. 31. He took advantage of the seed and produced his best result at a major tournament at the time, a fourth round loss to No. 10 John Isner.

Tsitsipas had his second big breakthrough of the year in the lead up to the US Open. After reaching the semifinals in Washington, he reached his second final of the season and first career Masters final at the Canadian Open. During the tournament, he became the youngest player to record four top ten wins in a single event, defeating No. 8 Dominic Thiem, No. 10 Novak Djokovic, No. 3 Alexander Zverev, and No. 6 Kevin Anderson in succession. He also saved match points in the latter two matches. Tsitsipas lost the final to Nadal on his 20th birthday in a closer match than their first encounter. He also climbed to No. 15 in the world.

At the US Open, Tsitsipas made his main draw debut, but was upset in the second round by fellow Next Gen player Daniil Medvedev. He cited fatigue as a factor in the loss and proceeded to exit before the quarterfinals at three of his next four tournaments as well. However, Tsitsipas was able to recover at the Stockholm Open. Playing as the third seed, he defeated second seed and No. 14 Fabio Fognini in the semifinals before winning in the final against veteran qualifier Ernests Gulbis. With the victory, he became the first Greek player to win an ATP title. Tsitsipas closed out his season at the Next Gen ATP Finals. He was the top seed at the event and was drawn with Frances Tiafoe, Hubert Hurkacz, and Jaume Munar. Tsitsipas swept his group and defeated Andrey Rublev to advance to the final against second seed Alex de Minaur. He defeated de Minaur in four sets to win the Next Gen Finals. At the end of the year, Tsitsipas was named the ATP Most Improved Player for his breakthrough season.

=== 2019: ATP Finals title, Australian semis, No. 5 ===
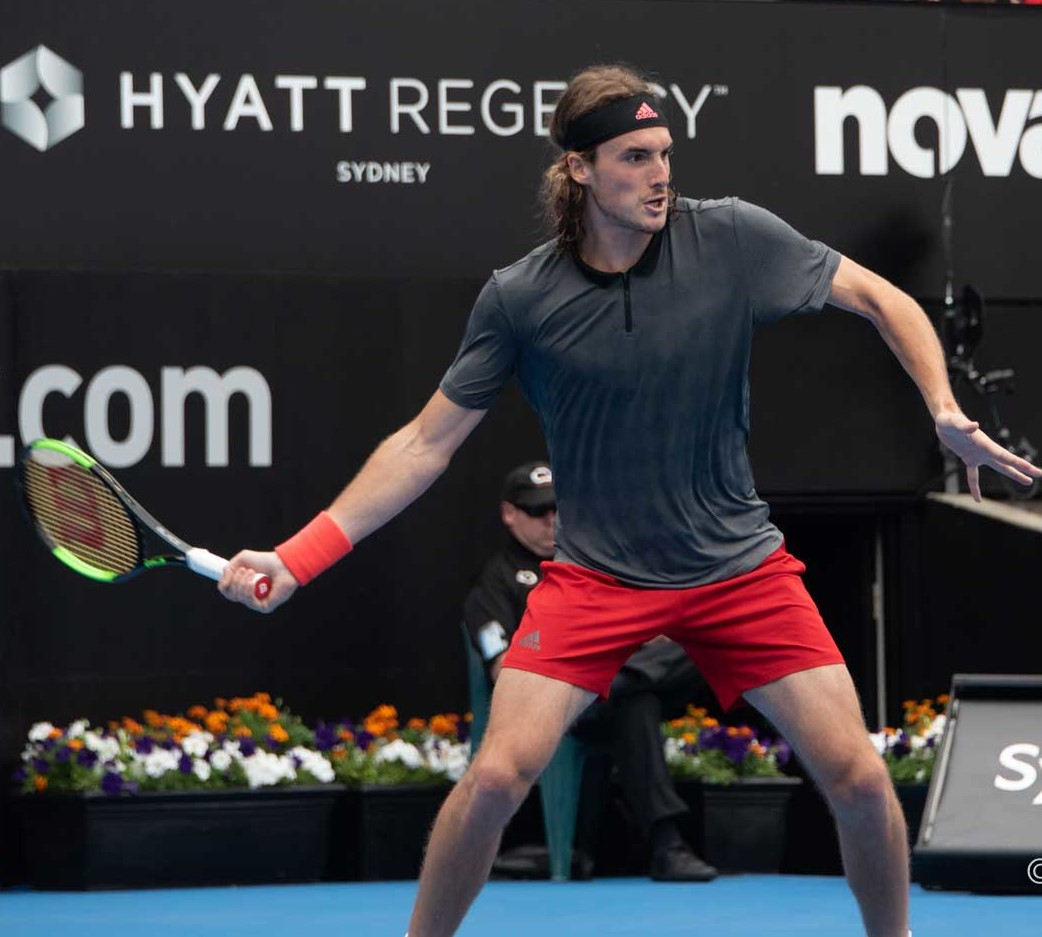
Tsitsipas at the 2019 Sydney International

Tsitsipas began the season at the Hopman Cup alongside Maria Sakkari, making them the first team to represent Greece at the event in 17 years. They finished in a three-way tie for first in their round-robin group, having won their ties against the United States and Switzerland after being upset in their opening tie against Great Britain. They were ranked second on the tiebreak criteria and did not advance out of the group. Tsitsipas's only singles win was against Frances Tiafoe, while one of his losses was against Roger Federer. At the 2019 Australian Open, Tsitsipas reached his first major semifinal, despite having won just five Grand Slam singles matches in total the previous year. All five of his wins at the event came in four sets. He upset world No. 3 and defending champion Roger Federer in the fourth round, saving all twelve of the break points he faced in a rematch of their Hopman Cup encounter earlier in the month. After continuing his run against Roberto Bautista Agut, he easily lost to No. 2 Rafael Nadal, winning only six games. Nonetheless, his performance helped him climb to a career-best ranking of No. 12 in the world to become the highest-ranked Greek player in history.

Tsitsipas built on his Grand Slam success by reaching two finals in February in back-to-back weeks. He won his second career title at the Open 13 in Marseille over Mikhail Kukushkin before finishing runner-up to Federer at the Dubai Tennis Championships. His performance in Dubai put him in the top 10 of the ATP rankings for the first time. Tsitsipas closed out the early year hard court season with a career-best result in doubles, finishing runner-up to the Bryan brothers at the Miami Open with Wesley Koolhof. Tsitsipas also had an excellent clay court season. He won his first career clay court title a month later at the Estoril Open after defeating Pablo Cuevas in the final. The following week, he made another Masters final at the Madrid Open. During the event, he defeated No. 4 Alexander Zverev and No. 2 Rafael Nadal in the quarterfinals and semifinals respectively before finishing runner-up to No. 1 Novak Djokovic. This was his first win over Nadal in four attempts. Nadal defeated Tsitsipas a week later at the Italian Open. Nonetheless, Tsitsipas rose to No. 6 in the world after this series of tournaments. At the French Open, Tsitsipas was upset in the fourth round by Stan Wawrinka, in a marathon five set match that ended 6–8 in the final set.

Despite a strong first half of the season, Tsitsipas began to struggle following the French Open. He lost his opening round matches at Wimbledon and the US Open to Thomas Fabbiano and Andrey Rublev respectively, and both Masters tournaments in August. Despite this, he reached a career-best ranking of No. 5 in early August. Tsitsipas ultimately rebounded beginning in October. He defeated Zverev again at the China Open en route to finishing runner-up to No. 5 Dominic Thiem. He then made two semifinals at the Shanghai Masters and the Swiss Indoors, losing to other top five players again in No. 4 Daniil Medvedev and No. 3 Roger Federer. At the end of the season, Tsitsipas qualified for the ATP Finals for the first time, where he was placed in a round-robin group with Nadal, Zverev, and Medvedev. He defeated both Medvedev and Zverev to advance to the knockout stages after two matches. He lost his last group match to Nadal. In the semifinals, Tsitsipas defeated Federer to set up a final against Thiem. Tsitsipas won the championship in a tight match that ended in a third set tiebreak to become the youngest winner of the year-end championship since Lleyton Hewitt in 2001. He finished the season at No. 6 in the world.

=== 2020: French Open semifinal ===
He entered the 2020 Australian Open seeded 6th in the men's bracket, but failed to repeat his success of 2019, losing in the 3rd round to Milos Raonic. He then entered the ABN AMRO World Tennis Tournament seeded 2nd, but failed to live up to his seed as he lost in the round of 16 to Aljaž Bedene. He recovered quickly to defend his title at the Open 13 tournament, winning his 5th ATP title, recording in the process 4 wins in a row without dropping a set, and defeating Félix Auger-Aliassime in the final. The following week he entered the Dubai Tennis Championships as the second seed behind Novak Djokovic. He recorded 4 wins in a row, reaching the final for the second successive year, where he lost in straight sets to the World No. 1.

At the US Open, he was seeded 4th in the men's bracket. He beat Albert Ramos Viñolas and Maxime Cressy without dropping a set before losing to Borna Ćorić in the third round despite having six match points and being a break up in the 5th set.

At the French Open, he was seeded 5th and reached the semifinal, defeating Grigor Dimitrov and Andrey Rublev, before losing to Djokovic in five sets.

Tsitsipas was unable to defend his 2019 ATP Finals title. He was eliminated from the season ending event with a 1–2 record during the round-robin portion of the competition, having defeated Andrey Rublev, but losing to Dominic Thiem and Rafael Nadal.

=== 2021: French Open final, Monte-Carlo title, No. 3 ===
Tsitsipas started his 2021 Australian Open campaign with a comfortable straight sets win over Gilles Simon, before surviving a five set thriller with Thanasi Kokkinakis. He then beat Mikael Ymer in straight sets before being given a walkover by an injured Matteo Berrettini. In the quarterfinals, Tsitsipas became only the second player along with Fabio Fognini at the 2015 US Open to beat Rafael Nadal in a grand slam match from two sets to love down. He eventually lost in the semifinals to Daniil Medvedev. In Rotterdam, Tsitsipas lost in the semifinals to the eventual champion Andrey Rublev.

In April, Tsitsipas won his first Masters 1000 title at the Monte-Carlo Masters, after defeating Aslan Karatsev, Cristian Garín, Alejandro Davidovich Fokina, Dan Evans and Andrey Rublev. In doing so, Tsitsipas became the first Greek player in history to win a Masters title. In May, Tsitsipas defeated Cameron Norrie in straight sets to win the 2021 Lyon Open and his seventh career title.

At the French Open, Tsitsipas beat Pablo Carreño Busta and Daniil Medvedev to reach his second consecutive French Open semifinal and third Grand Slam semifinal. He beat Alexander Zverev in five sets to become the first Greek player in history to reach a major final. Tsitsipas achieved a career-high ranking of World No. 4 by advancing to the championship match. There, he lost to world No.1 Novak Djokovic in five sets despite holding a two sets to love lead.

Tsitsipas suffered an early exit at Wimbledon, losing to Frances Tiafoe in the first round. He took his revenge for the Wimbledon loss by defeating Tiafoe in the second round at the 2020 Olympics. He became the first Greek man to win a singles match at the Olympic Games with his first round win over Philipp Kohlschreiber since Augustos Zerlandis in 1924. He lost in the third round to Ugo Humbert of France in three sets. At the US Open, Tsitsipas defeated Andy Murray in 5 sets and Adrian Mannarino in 4 sets to reach the third round. In the third round, he was defeated in 5 sets with a final set tiebreak by World No. 55 and 18 year-old Carlos Alcaraz. At the 2021 BNP Paribas Open he reached the quarterfinals, beating Pedro Martínez, Fabio Fognini and Alex de Minaur before losing to Nikoloz Basilashvili. At the ATP Finals, Tsitsipas lost in straight sets to Andrey Rublev before withdrawing from the tournament due to an elbow injury.

==== Bathroom Break Controversy ====
At the US Open, he faced a backlash for taking extended bathroom breaks. In the Cincinnati Masters before the US Open, during a match against Alexander Zverev, Tsitsipas landed in a controversy for taking an extended toilet break after Zverev complained to the umpire about the situation. In the US Open, the controversy became worse, after Tsitsipas took a toilet break twice, when he was losing his first round match against Andy Murray, and even asked to stop the match while down in one of the games. Murray complained after the second toilet break, claiming that Tsitsipas's breaks are too long and change the momentum of the game. He claimed to have "lost all respect" for Tsitsipas, and later, after losing the match, wrote on Twitter, claiming that it takes Tsitsipas twice as long to go to the toilet as it takes Jeff Bezos to fly into space.

=== 2022: Second Monte-Carlo title, first grass title ===
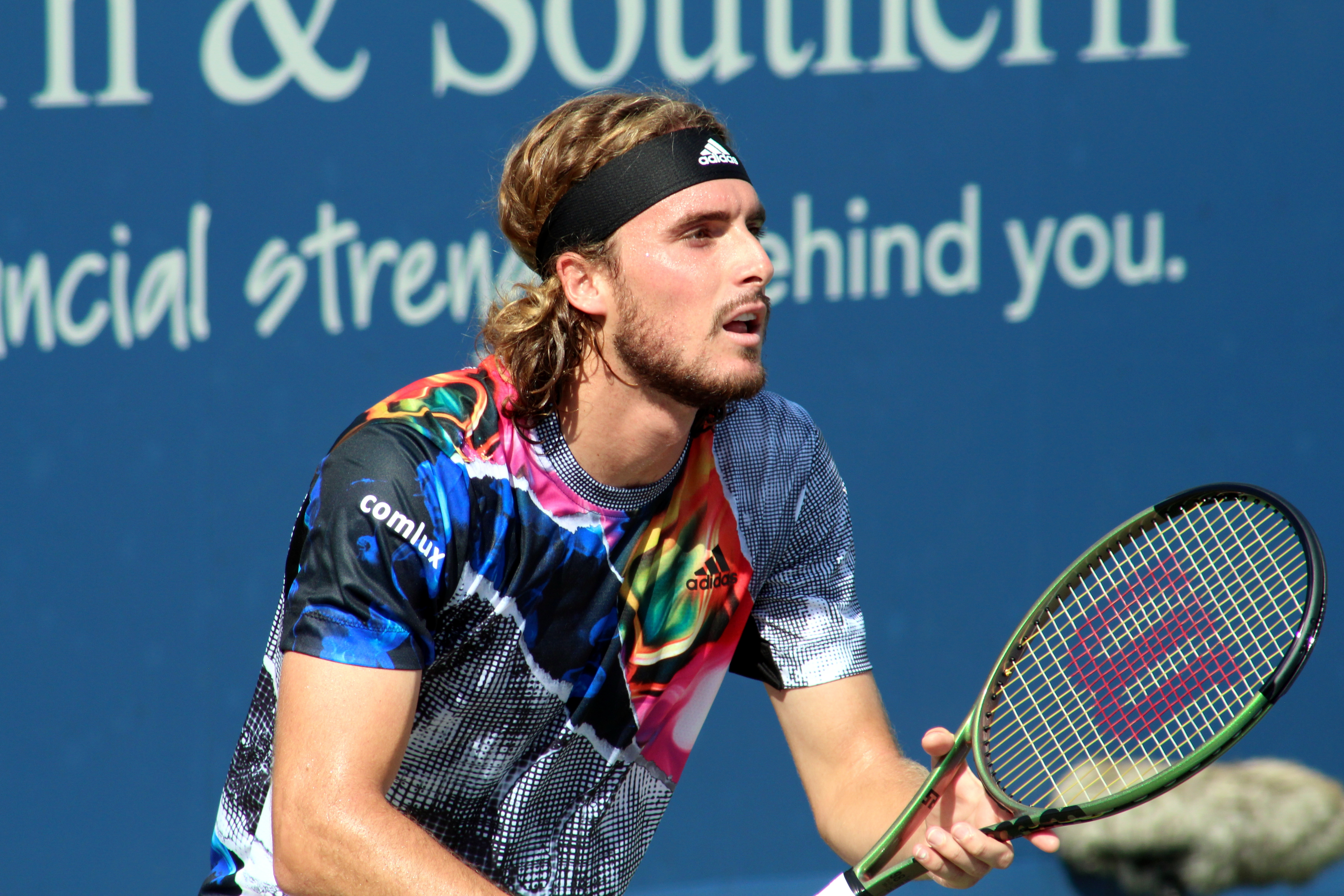
Stefanos Tsitsipas at the 2022 Western and Southern Tournament.

At the 2022 Australian Open, Tsitsipas reached the semifinals for the third time, where he faced Daniil Medvedev in a rematch of the previous year's semifinal. He lost in four sets, and received a coaching violation when his father Apostolos was caught coaching in Greek.

Tsitsipas became the first man born in 1998 or later to get 200 career tour-level wins after defeating Laslo Đere in the first round at the Abierto Mexicano Telcel tournament.

Stefanos Tsitsipas successfully defended his Monte-Carlo Masters title against Spaniard Alejandro Davidovich Fokina in two sets to capture his second Masters 1000 title. At the Italian Open, he reached the quarterfinals, defeating Grigor Dimitrov in the second round, saving two match points in the process and Karen Khachanov in the round of 16. In the quarterfinals, he defeated Jannik Sinner to reach his third straight semifinal at a Masters level, earning a tour-leading 30 wins for the season. Next he defeated Alexander Zverev, his second consecutive win on clay, for a place in the final. Tsitsipas and Zverev were the only players to reach the semifinals at all three Masters 1000 tournaments on clay in the season. In the finals, he lost to Novak Djokovic. At the French Open, where he was defending finalist points from 2021, Tsitsipas lost to Holger Rune in four sets.

After some early losses in the Stuttgart Open and the Halle Open, Tsitsipas won his first title on grass courts after receiving a last minute wildcard at the Mallorca Open, defeating Roberto Bautista Agut in three tight sets. At the Wimbledon Championship, Tsitsipas lost in the third round to Nick Kyrgios in four sets. In a fiery match, Tsitsipas was fined $10,000 for two code violations.

In Cincinnati, he reached his third Masters 1000 final of the season but lost to the in-form Croatian Borna Ćorić. At the US Open, Tsitsipas was seeded fourth. He was defeated by qualifier Daniel Elahi Galán in four sets in the first round, although Tsitsipas saved eight match points.

In October, Tsitsipas reached the final of Astana Open in Kazakhstan, which he lost in straight sets to Novak Djokovic. Next he reached his seventh final at the Stockholm Open but he was defeated by Holger Rune in straight sets. He lost in the second round in Vienna again to Borna Ćorić. He recorded his 60th win for 2022 defeating Tommy Paul in the quarterfinals of the Paris Masters to reach his fifth Masters semifinal for the season. In the semifinals, he lost to Novak Djokovic in three sets.

At the 2022 ATP Finals, he lost again to Djokovic, his ninth consecutive loss against the five-time season finale champion, and Andrey Rublev, thus not being able to get past the round robin stage. Tsitsipas ended the year with a tournament win, at the Mubadala World Tennis Championship.

=== 2023: Australian Open final, 300th career win ===
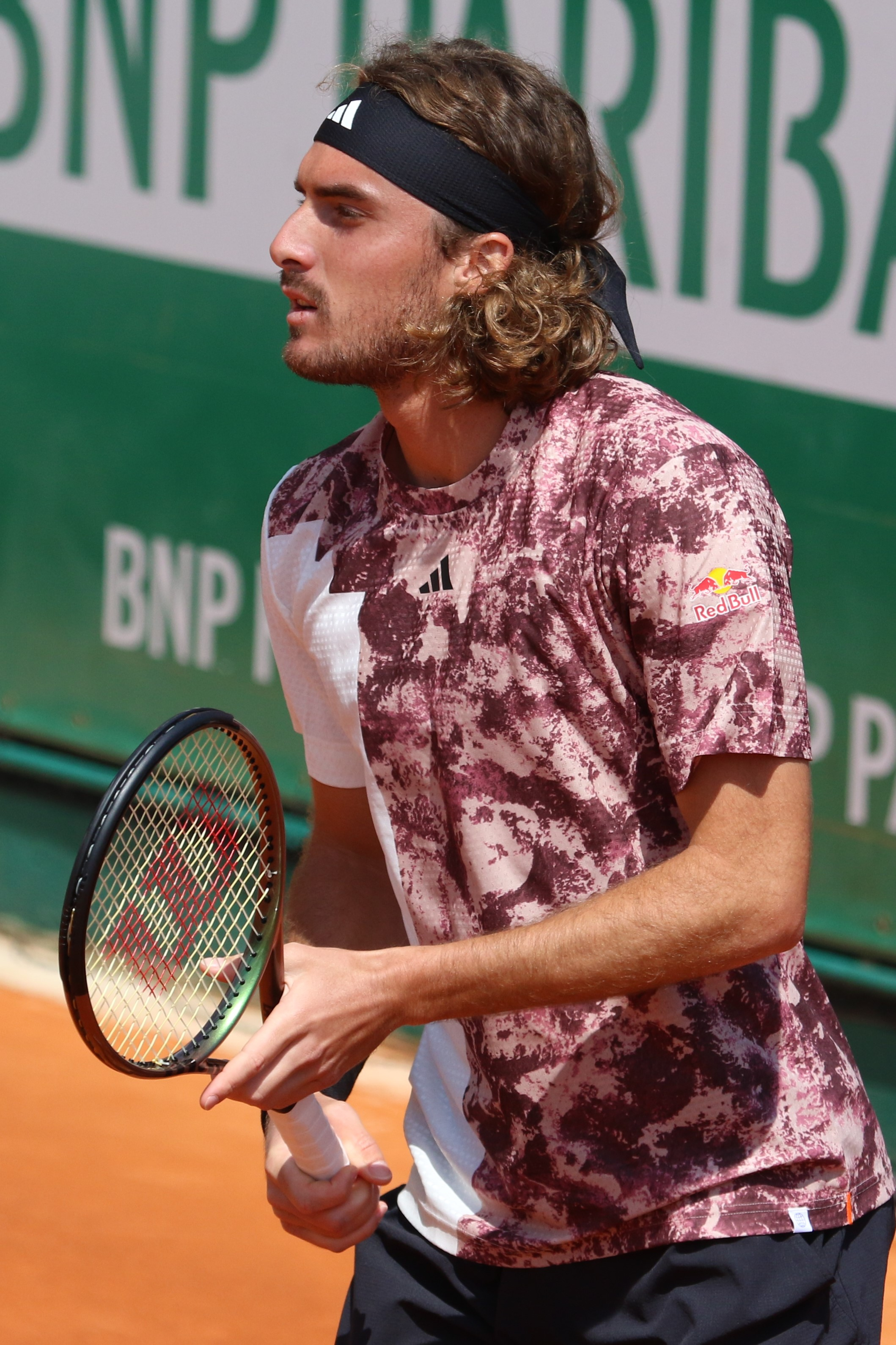
Tsitsipas at the 2023 Monte-Carlo Masters

He recorded his 250th win at the inaugural United Cup defeating Grigor Dimitrov. At the Australian Open, Tsitsipas defeated Quentin Halys, Rinky Hijikata, Tallon Griekspoor, Jannik Sinner, Jiří Lehečka, and Karen Khachanov on his way to his second Grand Slam final. In the final, Tsitsipas lost to Novak Djokovic, who tied Rafael Nadal's record of 22 Grand Slam titles. Had Tsitsipas won the title, he would have clinched the world No. 1 ranking for the first time.

Tsitsipas returned to the Sunshine Double in the United States. At the Indian Wells Masters, he experienced an early first round loss to Jordan Thompson in three close sets. In Miami, he lost to Karen Khachanov in the fourth round in straight sets.

He started his clay-court campaign at the Monte-Carlo Masters, where he was the two-time defending champion. He recorded 12 consecutive wins in the principality after defeating Benjamin Bonzi and Nicolás Jarry, but was ultimately defeated by American Taylor Fritz in straight sets in the quarterfinals. As a result, he dropped two spots to world No. 5. At the second clay court tournament of the year, the 2023 Barcelona Open Banc Sabadell, he defeated Pedro Cachin, Denis Shapovalov, Alex de Minaur, and Lorenzo Musetti to reach the second final of the season and third Barcelona final overall. He lost to the top seed Carlos Alcaraz in the championship match in straight sets.

In the summer grass season, he received wildcards for Stuttgart, Halle, and at the Mallorca Championships where he was the defending champion; he won one match across these tournaments. At Wimbledon, he played two five-set marathon matches against Dominic Thiem and Andy Murray, and a straight sets match against Laslo Djere to reach the round of 16 for the first time since 2018. His match with Thiem was ranked the fifth-best Grand Slam match of the year by ATPTour.com and his match against Murray spanned two days. In the round of 16, he lost to Christopher Eubanks in five sets.

In August, he won his tenth title at the Los Cabos Open, defeating John Isner, Nicolás Jarry, Borna Ćorić, and Alex de Minaur in straight sets in the final. In the warm-up Masters to the US Open, he won one match, against Ben Shelton in Cincinnati. During the match, he notably complained about a nearby audience member imitating bee buzzing noises during his match. His loss to Hubert Hurkacz in the second round resulting in him dropping finalist points from 2022, thus dropping to world No. 7. At the US Open, he lost to No. 128 Swiss player Dominic Stricker in five sets in the second round.

In November, in Paris, he recorded his 50th career win over Alexander Zverev for the season, only one of two players, male or female, to record 50 or more wins in each of the last three years, tied with Andrey Rublev. It was also his first top-10 win of the season. With this win, he qualified for the ATP Finals. Next he defeated 16th seed Karen Khachanov to record the 300th win of his career with a straight sets victory in the quarterfinals. He became the first man born in 1998 and the seventh born in the 1990s or later to reach 300 career wins. He lost to Grigor Dimitrov in the semifinals. In his fifth consecutive appearance at the ATP Finals, Tsitsipas lost to Jannik Sinner in straight sets and retired mid-way through his match against Holger Rune before withdrawing from the event due to a back injury. He ended the season at world No. 6.

=== 2024: Monte-Carlo title, French Open quarterfinals ===
Tsitsipas began his season at the United Cup representing Greece. He won his singles match against Steven Diez of Canada in straight sets before losing to Alexander Zverev of Germany in the quarterfinals. In Melbourne, where Tsitsipas was defending finalist points, he reached the round of 16 with wins against Zizou Bergs, Jordan Thompson, and Luca Van Assche. He lost to Taylor Fritz and subsequently dropped to world No. 10. After participating in play-offs for Davis Cup World Group 1 in Athens where he won against Marius Copil of Romania, he began his title defence at Los Cabos. He lost in the semifinals to Casper Ruud. The following week, he reached the quarterfinals of Acapulco, losing to eventual champion Alex De Minaur. At the Sunshine Double, Tsitsipas made the round of 16 in Indian Wells, losing to Jiří Lehečka, and lost to Denis Shapovalov in the second round at Miami.

He began his clay-court campaign at the Monte-Carlo Masters as the 12th seed. He defeated Tomás Martín Etcheverry, Alexander Zverev, and Karen Khachanov, all in straight sets, to reach the semi-final where he met Jannik Sinner. After a three set victory, he advanced to his third Monte Carlo final, where he defeated Casper Ruud in straight sets to win his third Masters 1000 title. The next week in Barcelona, he defeated Sebastian Ofner, Roberto Carballés Baena, Facundo Díaz Acosta, and Dušan Lajović to reach the second final of the season and fourth Barcelona final overall. He lost to Casper Ruud in the championship match in straight sets, his eleventh loss in ATP 500 finals. In Rome, Tsitsipas reached the quarterfinals but lost to eventual finalist Nicolás Jarry. In Paris, Tsitsipas repeated his previous year's result by reaching the quarterfinals, but lost once again to Carlos Alcaraz who would go on to win the title.

Tsitsipas' grass season was uneventful, winning one match each at Halle and Wimbledon. Back on clay in Gstaad, he made semifinals by defeating Hamad Medjedovic and Fabio Fognini in straight sets. He lost to eventual champion Matteo Berrettini. At the Paris Olympics, Tsitsipas improved on his result in 2021 by becoming the first Greek tennis player to reach the quarterfinals stage at the Games since tennis returned to the program in 1988. In his quarterfinal match, he lost to Djokovic, the eventual gold medallist.

Following the Olympics, Tsitsipas returned to North America to play the warm-up Masters tournaments to the US Open. His run at Montreal was cut short by a resurgent Kei Nishikori in the second round. He followed this match by announcing the end of his coaching partnership with his father, Apostolos, citing desires to maintain healthier boundaries between tennis and his family. In Cincinnati, he reached the second round, losing to Jack Draper. At US Open, Tsitsipas exited the tournament early following a first-round defeat against Thanasi Kokkinakis in four sets. In his next match at the Laver Cup in Berlin, Tsitsipas won comprehensively against Kokkinakis in straight sets before going on to win the event with Team Europe.

At the end of September, Tsitsipas participated in Tokyo, losing to Alex Michelsen in the first round. His run in Shanghai included straight sets wins against Kei Nishikori and Alexandre Müller before ending with a fourth round defeat to Danill Medvedev. In the latter match, he engaged in a heated exchange with the umpire due to a time violation. His European indoor season included quarterfinal runs in Antwerp and Basel, losing to Jiří Lehečka and Arthur Fils, respectively. In the final Masters 1000 tournament of the year, Tsitsipas reached the quarterfinals with wins over Roberto Carballes Baena, Alejandro Tabilo, and Francisco Cerundolo to set up a rematch with Alexander Zverev. Zverev defeated Tsitsipas in straight sets before going on to win the title. As a result, Tsitsipas failed to accrue enough points to directly qualify for the ATP Finals for the first time in six years, becoming the second alternate behind Grigor Dimitrov. He ended the year ranked world No. 11, his lowest year-end ranking since 2018.

=== 2025: First ATP 500 title, injuries, out of top 20 ===
For the sixth consecutive year, Tsitsipas began his year at the team event in Australia, the United Cup. With Team Greece, he defeated Pablo Carreño Busta in three sets and followed with a straight sets loss to Alexander Shevchenko of Kazakhstan. At the Australian Open, he recorded his earliest defeat in Melbourne since 2018 with a first round exit against Alex Michelsen. As a result, his ranking dropped to world No. 12. After leaving Australia, he accepted a wild card for Rotterdam, where he reached the quarterfinal stage. He lost to Italian qualifier Mattia Bellucci in straight sets. In Doha, Tsitsipas lost in the first round to Hamad Medjedovic in three sets despite his opponent's struggle with a hamstring injury.

In Dubai, with his second round win against Karen Khachanov, Tsitsipas recorded his 350th career win, being the 13th active player to do so. His win against Tallon Griekspoor in the semifinal moved him to his third final in three consecutive Dubai appearances and his twelfth ATP 500 final. He won the title after defeating Félix Auger-Aliassime in straight sets, returning him to the top 10 with a ranking of world No. 9. In the process, he snapped his eleven match streak of losses in ATP 500 finals and won his twelfth tour-level title, his first on hard court title since 2019.

In the spring clay season, Tsitsipas was unable to defend his title at Monte-Carlo, following a quarterfinal defeat to Lorenzo Musetti in three sets, dropping out of the top 10 the following week. He would go on to retire in his quarterfinal match against Arthur Fils in Barcelona, where he was defending finalist points. In the Masters 1000 tournaments of Madrid and Rome, he lost in the third round both instances, losing to Musetti and Fils again, respectively. In Paris, Tsitsipas dropped out of the top 20 for the first time since October 2018 after a second round loss to Matteo Gigante in four sets. His grass season was marked by a three-set win against Luciano Darderi before a straight sets loss to Alex Michelsen, his second loss against the American in 2025, in Halle, then a retirement due to back injury against Valentin Royer in Wimbledon.

During the clay and grass seasons, Tsitsipas trialled Goran Ivanisevic as part of his coaching team yielding poor results, being given a scathing review for his lack of effort by Ivanisevic following his Wimbledon retirement and eventually parting ways two months later. Following a second-round defeat to Christopher O'Connell at the Canadian Open, Tsitsipas announced his father would return to his team as his coach. Tsitsipas' autumn season in the United States included a third round loss to Benjamin Bonzi in Cincinnati, a second round loss to Bu Yunchaokete in Winston-Salem, and a five-set defeat to Daniel Altmeier in New York.

Tsitsipas went on to withdraw from the remainder of the season including the Shanghai Masters due to leg injury, Vienna Open due to a back injury, and ending his season after announcing his withdrawal from the Paris Masters. Despite his withdrawals, he participated in the second edition of the Six Kings Slam in Riyadh, Saudi Arabia, where he lost to Jannik Sinner in straight sets. Tsitsipas ended the year ranked world No. 34, another lowest year-end ranking since 2017.

=== 2026: 13th career title ===
In 2026, Tsitsipas participated in the United Cup to open his season in Perth. He won a straight sets match against Shintaro Mochizuki of Japan and a three-set grueling battle against Billy Harris of Great Britain. He then achieved his first top 20 win at any level since the Olympic Games in 2024, defeating Taylor Fritz in the quarterfinals. Team Greece would go on to lose the tie to Team USA and exit the tournament. Tsitsipas made a brief appearance in Adelaide the following week, losing to Aleksandar Vukic in straight sets. At the Australian Open, Tsitsipas improved on his previous year's result, losing in the second round to Tomáš Macháč.

Back in Athens, Tsitsipas played with Team Greece against Team Mexico, winning both of his matches in the Davis Cup World Group I play-offs. In Rotterdam, he lost to Botic van de Zandschulp in straight sets. In Doha, Tsitsipas won straight set matches against Moez Echargui and Daniil Medvedev, the latter being his first win against the Russian in four years, moving to his first tour-level quarterfinal in 10 months. He would lose the quarterfinal to Andrey Rublev in straight sets. In Dubai, Tsitsipas lost in the first round to Ugo Humbert, dropping out of the top 40 after failing to defend his title points.

During the Sunshine Double, Tsitsipas clashed with Denis Shapovalov in Indian Wells, losing in straight sets. With this loss, he briefly exited the top 50 but recovered after notching a second top 10 win of the season in Miami against Alex de Minaur in straight sets. He would move on to lose to Arthur Fils in his quickest defeat, only winning a singular game in the 55-minute straight sets encounter.

Beginning the spring clay season, he played in the Ultimate Tennis Showdown event held at the Arènes de Nîmes, losing to Andrey Rublev in the quartefinals, before winning against Ugo Humbert in the classification match. At the Monte-Carlo Masters, Tsitsipas recorded his worst run at the event, exiting in the opening round to Francisco Cerúndolo in straight sets and dropping out of the top 50 as a result. Failing to defend quarterfinal points from the previous year in Barcelona following an opening round loss to Fábián Marozsán in Munich, Tsitsipas dropped out of the top 80. He rebounded in Madrid, scoring three consecutive wins, including against world No. 11 Alexander Bublik. In the round of 16, despite holding two match points on serve in the deciding set, Tsitsipas lost to the defending champion, Casper Ruud. Facing Macháč again in Rome, Tsitsipas failed to score a win against the Czech in their first round encounter. In Geneva and Paris, Tsitsipas was unable to move past the second round in either tournament, losing to Learner Tien and Matteo Arnaldi.

On the grass, Tsitsipas re-entered the tour at the Mallorca Championships, a week before Wimbledon. He fell in the first round to Ignacio Buse in straight sets, notably complaining about the quality of the tennis balls in the process. On June 28, 2026, a day before the opening day at Wimbledon, Tsitsipas removed his father, Apostolos, from his coaching team, citing a desire to do 'something different'. He went on to exit the tournament after a straight sets defeat against eventual semifinalist, Novak Djokovic, in their first match since their final encounter at the 2023 Australian Open.

Following Wimbledon, Tsitsipas entered the summer clay court season in Gstaad, Switzerland. There, he won the tournament, winning four of his matches in deciding sets including one match completed over two days due to fading light. In the final, he defeated seventh seed Raphaël Collignon to claim his first title of the 2026 season and raising his ranking by thirty-one places to world No. 51.

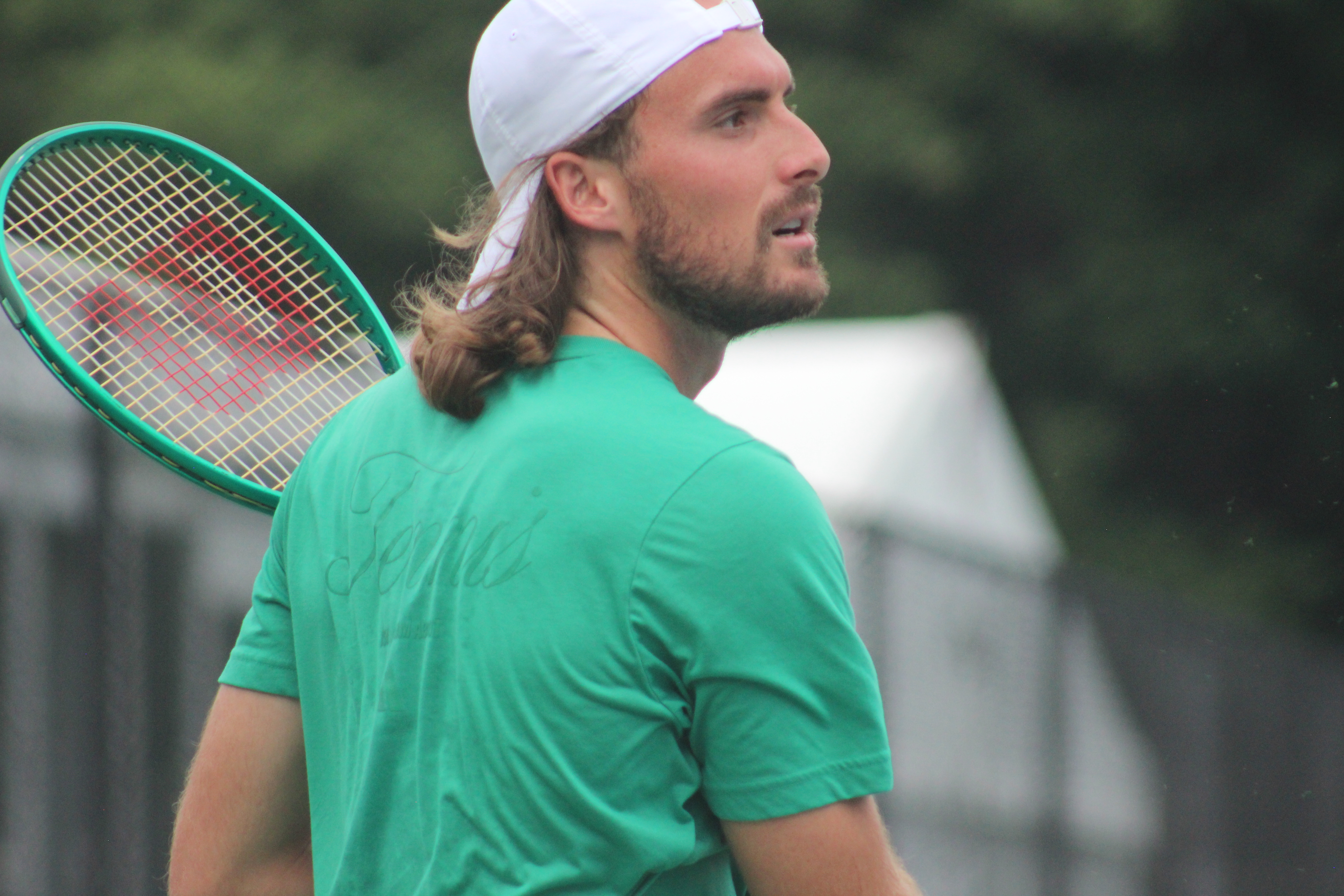
Stefanos Tsitsipas training during the DC Open, July 28, 2026

At the 2026 US Open, Tsitsipas reached the fourth round, where he was defeated by eventual finalist Ben Shelton in straight sets. This was Tsitsipas's career-best performance at the US Open, eclipsing his 2020 and 2021 third round appearances, and it was his best grand slam performance since his quarter-final appearance at the 2024 French Open.

== Playing style ==
Tsitsipas is an aggressive baseliner capable of an all-court player style as well. He aims to hit powerful groundstroke winners and has a particularly strong forehand using an Eastern grip. His forehand is particularly useful in finishing points off of the first serve, as combined with his big serve. He uses his high topspin rate to push opponents off the court for winners, or go to the net more often than the typical baseliner. One of his weaknesses is to overhit and make unforced errors while trying to hit winners. He also struggles returning serve against players with strong kick serves on the backhand side, a weakness he has worked to improve through usage of blocked and slice returns on his backhand.

His favourite shot is his one-handed backhand, a rarity in modern tennis, although it is one of his biggest weaknesses. He experimented with both one-handed and two-handed backhands in his youth, but chose to go with the former at around eight years old because both of his parents as well as his idol Roger Federer all use a one-handed backhand, and also because it felt more natural. His favourite shot is the backhand down-the-line.

Tsitsipas is regarded as having an all-court game. His favourite surface is grass and Wimbledon is his favourite tournament. Tsitsipas mainly excels on clay, having grown up playing on that surface in Greece. He has said, "I feel very confident when I step on the dirt. I always show my best tennis on this surface." Tsitsipas won all three of his master's titles on clay at the Monte-Carlo Masters. Tsitsipas has also done well on hard courts, reaching two Masters finals (Canada, Cincinnati) and three Australian Open semifinals (before reaching the final in 2023).

Former British No. 1 players Greg Rusedski and Annabel Croft have both praised Tsitsipas's on-court demeanor in conjunction with his style of play. Rusedski in particular has said that "[Tsitsipas] reminds me a little bit of Björn Borg. He does all the right things, he is spectacular as a tennis player and was just sensational with the way he was so calm and composed and he didn't blink when it came to the crunch. He has the competitive nature of Andy Murray, but he also has a calmness which reminds me of Roger Federer."

== Rivalries ==
=== Tsitsipas vs. Medvedev ===
External videos
- Post-match encounter at the 2018 Miami Open on YouTube. Medvedev yelled to Tsitsipas: "Man, you better shut your fuck up, okay? Hey Stefanos, you wanna look at me and talk? You have some problems, you go emergency toilet for five minutes? ... And then you hit let and you don't say sorry, you think you are a good kid? Look at me! Hey, look at me, huh? You don't look at me? He started it. He started it. He started it. Yes, he started it. He said 'bullshit Russian', you think this is normal? I answer him because he doesn't know how to fight. He's a small kid who doesn't know how to fight. If he doesn't say anything, I have no problems with him. But if he says something to me and he wants to fight, he needs to do it. But he doesn't look at me after".

Stefanos Tsitsipas and Daniil Medvedev have faced each other 16 times since 2018, with Medvedev leading the rivalry, 11–5. Medvedev won his first five matches against Tsitsipas, but Tsitsipas has won five of their next nine.

Medvedev and Tsitsipas first played each other in the first round of the 2018 Miami Open, when both were ranked outside of the top 50. Medvedev made a comeback after dropping the first set to win 6–2 in the third. However, the match is better remembered for a verbal altercation after the players shook hands. Russian Medvedev was upset about some of his opponent's etiquette during the match, especially the Greek's muttered "bullshit Russian" heard at the net, and yelled at Tsitsipas from his bench, "Man, you better shut your [sic] fuck up, okay?" He then got up and began complaining that Tsitsipas had taken a long bathroom break (Medvedev also took one) and took issue with Tsitsipas not apologizing for hitting the net cord during a point. As the chair umpire intervened, Tsitsipas quietly packed his bag to leave the court while Medvedev continued, "Look at me... He started it... He's a small kid who doesn't know how to fight".

Of the "bullshit Russian" remark, Tsitsipas has said that Medvedev had been chiding him midmatch for not apologizing for hitting the net cord, but that he "did get pissed and said what I said, which I do regret". Tsitsipas's mother said in an interview: "It was just a tense moment, it wasn't personal. Our families are very close. In fact, Daniil's parents were in our house two weeks ago for dinner. Stefanos has nothing against Russia". She later said both players have "room to grow".

Their relationship "thawed" over time and "kind of got better" after they were teammates at the 2021 Laver Cup.

At the 2022 Australian Open, No. 2 seed Medvedev and No. 4 seed Tsitsipas met in the semifinals. A rematch of their 2021 semifinal that Medvedev won in straight sets, both players received fines from the ATP due to their behaviour during the match. Medvedev was fined A$12,000 (US$9,022.56) for unsportsmanlike conduct toward chair umpire Jaume Campistol. During a changeover in the second set, after dropping his serve with a double fault, Medvedev erupted in frustration, yelling repeatedly at the umpire, "His father can talk every point? Bro, are you stupid? His father can talk every point?! ... Can his father talk every point?!" He later called Campistol a "small cat" for not citing his opponent for on-court coaching. Tsitsipas's father Apostolos, who often gets coaching warnings at his son's matches, was in fact shouting finable advice (in Greek) from the player's box, something tournament officials eventually laid bare in the fourth set in a "sting operation" using Greek umpire Eva Asderaki-Moore. Tsitsipas failed to win another game after he was given a coaching warning and fined A$5,000 (US$3,759.4). Medvedev managed to lock in on return as the match went on, winning 7–6^{(7–5)}, 4–6, 6–4, 6–1.

=== Tsitsipas vs. Zverev ===
Stefanos Tsitsipas and Alexander Zverev have faced each other 16 times since 2018, with Tsitsipas leading the rivalry 10–6. Alongside Daniil Medvedev, they are considered the best of their generation. They have competed in five three-set matches, with Tsitsipas winning three of them, but Zverev won their most memorable three-set match, that being an epic at the 2021 Cincinnati Masters semifinal, in which Zverev prevailed. Tsitsipas won their only Grand Slam match to date, in the 2021 French Open semifinals, winning in a five-set marathon match.

== Personal life ==
Tsitsipas studied at an English-language school in his youth. He can speak English, Greek and Russian. He is a supporter of Greek football club AEK Athens. Tsitsipas' hobbies include vlogging. He hosts his own YouTube channel where he posts videos of his travels. He was in a relationship with fellow tennis player Paula Badosa from May 2023 until June 2025, when they announced on Instagram they had amicably parted ways; the pair reconciled three weeks later. In similar fashion to the coaching relationship with his father, Tsitsipas' and Badosa's relationship ultimately ended acrimoniously. Since September 2025, he is dating American former collegiate tennis player Kristen Thoms. The couple went public in January 2026 after sharing a travel vlog from their vacation in Namibia.

Tsitsipas credits his mother's twin sister, who was also a professional tennis player in the Soviet Union, with financial support so that he could be accompanied by his father and compete as a junior player. His maternal grandfather Sergei Salnikov was an Olympic gold medal-winning member of the Soviet national football team and a former manager of FC Spartak Moscow.

During a Futures tournament in Crete, Tsitsipas nearly drowned while swimming at sea on an off-day. After a current carried him away from the shore, his father noticed what had happened and helped save his life. He attributes his confident approach of "[feeling] absolutely zero fear on the court" to the perspective he gained from this experience.

He is a Greek Orthodox Christian.

Tsitsipas has expressed interest in promoting the sport of tennis in Greece, where he has said "tennis is not very popular." After his finals appearance at the 2018 Barcelona Open, he noted that his success was helping him achieve this goal. Of his performance and the attention it received, he stated, "Many people were talking about [the final] and I had plenty of interviews that I did on big channels in Greece for big media centres. It got people's attention... It makes me motivated to do even better in the future, and become even more popular... I hope to inspire more people to play tennis in Greece."

== Career statistics ==
=== Grand Slam tournament performance timeline ===
Key
W	F	SF	QF	#R	RR	Q#	DNQ	A	NH

(W) winner; (F) finalist; (SF) semifinalist; (QF) quarterfinalist; (#R) rounds 4, 3, 2, 1; (RR) round-robin stage; (Q#) qualification round; (DNQ) did not qualify; (A) absent; (NH) not held; (SR) strike rate (events won / competed); (W–L) win–loss record.
To avoid confusion and double counting, these charts are updated at the conclusion of a tournament or when the player's participation has ended.

Current through the 2026 US Open.

Tournament	2017	2018	2019	2020	2021	2022	2023	2024	2025	2026	SR	W–L	Win %
Australian Open	Q2	1R	SF	3R (Note: Tsitsipas received walkovers in the second round of the 2020 Australian Open and the fourth round of the 2021 Australian Open, which do not officially count as wins.)	SF	SF	F	4R	1R	2R	0 / 9	25–9	74%
French Open	1R	2R	4R	SF	F	4R	QF	QF	2R	2R	0 / 10	28–10	74%
Wimbledon	1R	4R	1R	NH	1R	3R	4R	2R	1R	2R	0 / 9	10–9	53%
US Open	Q3	2R	1R	3R	3R	1R	2R	1R	2R	4R	0 / 9	10–9	53%
Win–loss	0–2	5–4	8–4	8–3	12–4	10–4	14–4	8–4	2–4	6–4	0 / 37	73–37	66%

=== Grand Slam tournaments ===
==== Singles: 2 (2 runner-ups) ====
Result	Year	Tournament	Surface	Opponent	Score
Loss	2021	French Open	Clay	(Serbia) Novak Djokovic	7–6^{(8–6)}, 6–2, 3–6, 2–6, 4–6
Loss	2023	Australian Open	Hard	(Serbia) Novak Djokovic	3–6, 6–7^{(4–7)}, 6–7^{(5–7)}

=== Year-end championships (ATP Finals) ===
==== Singles: 1 (title) ====
Result	Year	Tournament	Surface	Opponent	Score
Win	2019	ATP Finals, UK	Hard (i)	(Austria) Dominic Thiem	6–7^{(6–8)}, 6–2, 7–6^{(7–4)}

=== ATP 1000 tournaments ===
==== Singles: 7 (3 titles, 4 runner-ups) ====
Result	Year	Tournament	Surface	Opponent	Score
Loss	2018	Canadian Open	Hard	(Spain) Rafael Nadal	2–6, 6–7^{(4–7)}
Loss	2019	Madrid Open	Clay	(Serbia) Novak Djokovic	3–6, 4–6
Win	2021	Monte-Carlo Masters	Clay	(Russia) Andrey Rublev	6–3, 6–3
Win	2022	Monte-Carlo Masters (2)	Clay	(Spain) Alejandro Davidovich Fokina	6–3, 7–6^{(7–3)}
Loss	2022	Italian Open	Clay	(Serbia) Novak Djokovic	0–6, 6–7^{(5–7)}
Loss	2022	Cincinnati Open	Hard	(Croatia) Borna Ćorić	6–7^{(0–7)}, 2–6
Win	2024	Monte-Carlo Masters (3)	Clay	(Norway) Casper Ruud	6–1, 6–4

==== Doubles: 1 (runner-up) ====
Result	Year	Tournament	Surface	Partner	Opponents	Score
Loss	2019	Miami Open	Hard	(Netherlands) Wesley Koolhof	(United States) Bob Bryan (United States) Mike Bryan	5–7, 6–7^{(8–10)}

=== Records ===
==== Open Era records ====
Time span	Record accomplished	Players matched
2019	Winner of Next Gen ATP Finals and ATP Finals in consecutive years	Stands alone
2019	Won the ATP Finals title on debut	Àlex Corretja; Grigor Dimitrov; John McEnroe; Ilie Năstase; Stan Smith; Guillermo Vilas
2022	Defended his first ATP Masters 1000 title	Boris Becker; Lleyton Hewitt; Rafael Nadal

== Notes ==
Awards
Preceded by (Canada) Denis Shapovalov	ATP Most Improved Player; 2018	Succeeded by (Italy) Matteo Berrettini
