= Apostolos Tsitsipas =

Greek tennis coach (born 1967)

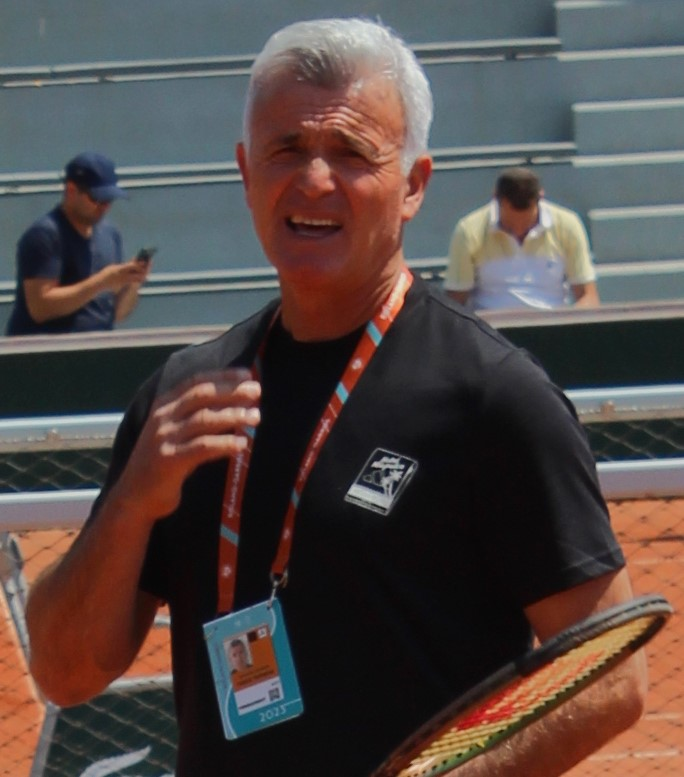
- Tsitsipas in 2023
- Country (sports): Greece
- Born: 24 November 1967 (age 58) Proastio, Karditsa, Greece
- Plays: Right-handed (one-handed backhand)

Coaching career
- Stefanos Tsitsipas (2001–2024, 2025–2026)

Coaching achievements
- Coachee singles titles total: 9
- List of notable tournaments (with champion) 2019 ATP Finals (Stefanos Tsitsipas)

Apostolos Tsitsipas (born 24 November 1967) is a Greek tennis coach. He is the father and longtime coach of Stefanos Tsitsipas, who achieved a career-high Association of Tennis Professionals (ATP) ranking of No. 3 on 9 August 2021. He is the husband of retired tennis player Julia Salnikova.

== Career ==
Tsitsipas grew up in the village of Proastio in Thessaly. In his youth, he primarily played football and basketball, but he and his brother sometimes "goofed around" playing tennis with wooden rackets on a makeshift grass court. Though briefly a member of the Greece national football team, he decided to pursue tennis seriously at age 20 while studying sport science at the University of Athens. He played in his first tournament at age 23, but never at a high enough level to earn an ATP ranking point.

Tsitsipas married the tennis player Julia Salnikova in 1991 after meeting her while working as a line judge at a Women's Tennis Association (WTA) tournament in Athens. He traveled with her on tour, then studied tennis coaching in Vienna and Berlin for several years, before moving back to Athens to work as a tennis instructor. He and Julia trained Stefanos, their first child, from the age of three. As Stefanos began to find success as a junior, Tsitsipas left a high school teaching position to travel with his son full-time from age 11 or 12. He played occasionally on the ITF Seniors Tour from 2003 to 2010, achieving a peak ranking of No. 310 in 2006. He served as the captain of the Greek contingent at the ATP Cup (2020–2022).

Tsitsipas has been Stefanos's primary coach on and off throughout the 2020s. He has often made his presence felt during matches. Before the ATP trialled coaching during matches in mid-2022, he often incurred Stefanos code violations by offering advice—reportedly against his son's wishes—aloud from the player's box. In the 2022 Australian Open semifinals, Tsitsipas's coaching spurred Daniil Medvedev to exclaim to the umpire, "His father can talk every point?", and prompted officials to place Greek umpire Eva Asderaki-Moore near the player's box to overhear his chatter, leading to a fine. Tennis commentator Jim Courier suggested after a Stefanos Tsitsipas loss in November 2022 that his father's coaching style during matches "[is] hurting him more than it's helping".

On June 28, 2026, a day before the opening day at the 2026 Wimbledon Championships, Stefanos removed Apostolos from his coaching team, citing a desire to do 'something different'.

== Personal life ==
Tsitsipas married the tennis player Julia Salnikova in 1991. All four children of Tsitsipas and Salnikova have played competitive tennis: Stefanos (born 1998), Petros (born 2000), Pavlos (born 2005), and Elisavet (born 2008).
