= List of settlements in the Karditsa regional unit =

Regional unit settlements

This is a list of settlements in the Karditsa regional unit, Greece:

- Achladia
- Agia Paraskevi
- Agia Triada
- Agiopigi
- Agios Akakios
- Agios Dimitrios
- Agios Georgios
- Agios Theodoros
- Agios Vissarios
- Agnantero
- Aidonochori
- Amarantos
- Ampeliko
- Ampelos
- Amygdali
- Anavra
- Anogeio
- Anthiro
- Anthochori
- Apidea
- Argithea
- Argyri
- Artesiano
- Asimochori
- Astritsa
- Belokomiti
- Charma
- Dafnospilia
- Dasochori
- Drakotrypa
- Drosato
- Ellinika
- Ellinokastro
- Ellinopyrgos
- Ermitsi
- Fanari
- Filia
- Fountoto
- Fragko
- Fylakti
- Fyllo
- Gefyria
- Gelanthi
- Georgiko
- Gorgovites
- Grammatiko
- Itea
- Kali Komi
- Kallifoni
- Kallithiro
- Kalogriana
- Kalyvakia
- Kanalia
- Kappadokiko
- Kappas
- Karditsa
- Karditsomagoula
- Karitsa Dolopon
- Karoplesi
- Karpochori
- Karvasara
- Karya
- Kastania
- Katafygio
- Katafylli
- Kedros
- Kerasea
- Koskina
- Koumpouriana
- Kranea
- Krya Vrysi
- Kryoneri
- Kryopigi
- Ktimeni
- Kypseli
- Lampero
- Lazarina
- Lefki
- Leontari
- Leontito
- Loutro
- Loutropigi
- Loxada
- Magoula
- Magoulitsa
- Makrychori
- Marathea
- Marathos
- Markos
- Mascholouri
- Mataragka
- Mavrommati
- Melissa
- Melissochori
- Mesenikolas
- Mesovouni
- Metamorfosi
- Mitropoli
- Molocha
- Morfovouni
- Moschato
- Mouzaki
- Myrina
- Neochori
- Neraida
- Orfana
- Oxya
- Palaiochori
- Palaiokklisi
- Palamas
- Paliouri
- Paschalitsa
- Pedino
- Pefkofyto
- Petrilo
- Petrino
- Petroto
- Pezoula
- Porti
- Portitsa
- Proastio
- Prodromos
- Ptelopoula
- Pyrgos Ithomis
- Pyrgos Kieriou
- Rachoula
- Rentina
- Rizovouni
- Rousso
- Sofades
- Stavros
- Stefaniada
- Sykies
- Therino
- Thrapsimi
- Vathylakkos
- Vatsounia
- Vlasi
- Vlochos
- Vragkiana
- Xinoneri
- Zaimi
