= Belokomiti =

Village and community in Karditsa, Greece

Belokomiti Μπελοκομίτη
- Community
- Location within Greece
- Coordinates: 39°15′N 21°43′E
- Country: Greece
- Administrative region: Thessaly
- Regional unit: Karditsa
- Municipality: Lake Plastiras
- Municipal unit: Nevropoli Agrafon

Population (2021)
  - Community: 211
- Time zone: UTC+2 (EET)
  - Summer (DST): UTC+3 (EEST)
- Vehicle registration: ΚΑ

Belokomiti (Greek: Μπελοκομίτη) is a mountain village and community in the municipal unit of Nevropoli Agrafon, Karditsa regional unit, Greece. The community Belokomiti includes the village Kedros. Belokomiti is situated in the Agrafa mountains, west of the artificial Lake Plastiras. It is located 9 km southeast of Kryoneri and 21 km southwest of Karditsa. The village is a tourist destination during the summer months. Among its attractions are the Gaki cave (σπηλιά του Γάκη) and its forests.

== Population ==
Year	Village population	Community population
1981	148	-
1991	148	-
2001	152	206
2011	146	178
2021	189	211

== See also ==
- List of settlements in the Karditsa regional unit
