= Moschato, Karditsa =

Moschato Μοσχάτο
- Community
- Location within Greece
- Coordinates: 39°19′N 21°48′E
- Country: Greece
- Administrative region: Thessaly
- Regional unit: Karditsa
- Municipality: Lake Plastiras
- Municipal unit: Plastiras

Population (2021)
  - Community: 424
- Time zone: UTC+2 (EET)
  - Summer (DST): UTC+3 (EEST)
- Vehicle registration: ΚΑ

Moschato (Greek: Μοσχάτο, before 1957: Μπλάσδο - Blasdo) is a village and a community in the municipal unit of Plastiras, Karditsa regional unit, Greece. The community includes the villages Agios Nikolaos and Tsardaki. It is located east of the Lake Plastiras, 4 km southwest of Mitropoli and 12 km southwest of Karditsa.

== Population ==
Year	Village population	Community population
2001	509	576
2011	378	428
2021	394	424

== See also ==
- List of settlements in the Karditsa regional unit
