= Kryoneri, Karditsa =

Kryoneri Κρυονέρι
- Community
- Location within Greece
- Coordinates: 39°20′N 21°41′E
- Country: Greece
- Administrative region: Thessaly
- Regional unit: Karditsa
- Municipality: Lake Plastiras
- Municipal unit: Nevropoli Agrafon

Population (2021)
  - Community: 564
- Time zone: UTC+2 (EET)
  - Summer (DST): UTC+3 (EEST)
- Vehicle registration: ΚΑ

Kryoneri (Greek: Κρυονέρι meaning "cold water", before 1927: Στούγκο - Stougko) is a mountain village and community in the municipal unit of Nevropoli Agrafon, Karditsa regional unit, Greece. The community Kryoneri includes the village Koutsodimos. Kryoneri is situated in the mountains northwest of Lake Plastiras, at about 880 m elevation. It is 11 km south of Mouzaki and 21 km west of the city of Karditsa. Its residents are based in agriculture.

== Population ==
Year	Village population	Community population
1981	610	-
1991	631	-
2001	692	818
2011	415	595
2021	500	564

== History ==
The village was founded in the valley southeast of its present location. It was relocated to its present, safer location during the Ottoman rule of Greece. The new village was named Stougko. As a result of the 1525 treaty of Tamasi, the Agrafa area was de facto independent; the name "Agrafa" means "unwritten", the area was not recorded by the Ottomans.

== See also ==
- List of settlements in the Karditsa regional unit
