= Agios Georgios, Karditsa =

Agios Georgios Άγιος Γεώργιος
- Community
- Location within Greece
- Coordinates: 39°18′N 21°50′E
- Country: Greece
- Administrative region: Thessaly
- Regional unit: Karditsa
- Municipality: Karditsa
- Municipal unit: Mitropoli

Population (2021)
  - Community: 311
- Time zone: UTC+2 (EET)
  - Summer (DST): UTC+3 (EEST)
- Vehicle registration: ΚΑ

Agios Georgios (Greek: Άγιος Γεώργιος meaning Saint George) is a village in the western part of the Karditsa regional unit, Greece. Agios Georgios is part of the municipal unit of Mitropoli. It is located near the foot of the mountains of Agrafa, 11 km southeast of Karditsa. Its residents are based in agriculture.

== Population ==
Historical population
Year	Pop.	±%
1981	619	—
1991	598	−3.4%
2001	523	−12.5%
2011	342	−34.6%
2021	311	−9.1%

== See also ==
- List of settlements in the Karditsa regional unit
