= Aidonochori, Karditsa =

Aidonochori Αηδονοχώρι
- Community
- Location within Greece
- Coordinates: 39°05′42″N 21°58′23″E
- Country: Greece
- Administrative region: Thessaly
- Regional unit: Karditsa
- Municipality: Sofades
- Municipal unit: Menelaida

Population (2021)
  - Community: 147
- Time zone: UTC+2 (EET)
  - Summer (DST): UTC+3 (EEST)

Aidonochori (Greek: Αηδονοχώρι) is a village located in the southern Agrafa region, Greece. It is part of the Karditsa regional unit. According to the latest reform, under the "Kallikrates" program, Aidonochori belongs to the municipality of Sofades and it owns under its jurisdiction an area of 26000 hectares.

It lies 3 km north of Rentina, 4 km southeast of Vathylakkos, 9 km northeast of Fourna and 31 km south of the town of Karditsa.

Aidonochori is located in an area with lush vegetation, at an altitude of 750 meters. The abundance of natural springs, within and outside the village, and the streams that surround it, make the area rich in water resources. This contributes both to preserve the indigenous flora and fauna, and the overall development of the region.
