= Anthiro =

Anthiro Ανθηρό
- Community
- Location within Greece
- Coordinates: 39°21′N 21°27′E
- Country: Greece
- Administrative region: Thessaly
- Regional unit: Karditsa
- Municipality: Argithea
- Municipal unit: Argithea

Population (2021)
  - Community: 462
- Time zone: UTC+2 (EET)
  - Summer (DST): UTC+3 (EEST)
- Vehicle registration: ΚΑ

Anthiro (Greek: Ανθηρό) is a mountain village in the western part of the Karditsa regional unit, Greece. Anthiro is the seat of the municipality of Argithea. Anthiro is located 20 km southwest of Mouzaki, 40 km west of Karditsa, and 19 km southwest of Pyli.

Its residents are based in agriculture which includes honey production. There is a museum in the village. Near the village are the Korakos bridge, built in the 12th century, and the Kleftovrysi and Stavro bridges.

== Population ==
Year	Village population	Community population
1981	-	784
1991	270	-
2001	183	498
2011	167	462
2021	236	638

== See also ==
- List of settlements in the Karditsa regional unit
