= Gelanthi =

Gelanthi Γελάνθη
- Community
- Location within Greece
- Coordinates: 39°26.3′N 21°42.4′E
- Country: Greece
- Administrative region: Thessaly
- Regional unit: Karditsa
- Municipality: Mouzaki
- Municipal unit: Mouzaki

Population (2021)
  - Community: 350
- Time zone: UTC+2 (EET)
  - Summer (DST): UTC+3 (EEST)
- Vehicle registration: ΚΑ

Gelanthi (Greek: Γελάνθη) is a village in the municipality of Mouzaki, in the Karditsa regional unit, Greece. It is situated on the right bank of the river Pamisos, 3 km south of Gomfoi, 4 km east of Mouzaki and 20 km northwest of Karditsa.

== Population ==
Historical population
Year	Pop.	±%
1981	540	—
1991	667	+23.5%
2001	491	−26.4%
2011	435	−11.4%
2021	350	−19.5%

== History ==
The village Gelanthi was first mentioned in 1810, when the English traveller William Martin Leake passed through it on his way from Fanari to Mouzaki. He found the village had thirty houses.

== See also ==
- List of settlements in the Karditsa regional unit
