= Stefaniada =

Stefaniada Στεφανιάδα
- Community
- Location within Greece
- Coordinates: 39°15′26″N 21°29′1″E
- Country: Greece
- Administrative region: Thessaly
- Regional unit: Karditsa
- Municipality: Argithea
- Municipal unit: Anatoliki Argithea

Population (2021)
  - Community: 109
- Time zone: UTC+2 (EET)
  - Summer (DST): UTC+3 (EEST)
- Postal code: 43060
- Vehicle registration: ΚΑ

Stefaniada (Greek: Στεφανιάδα) is a mountain village and local community (Greek: Τοπική κοινότητα) in the western part of the Karditsa regional unit, Thessaly, Greece. Since the 2011 local government reform it is part of the municipality Argithea, under the municipal unit Anatoliki Argithea. The local community has an area of 31.104 km^{2}. The community has a population of 109 (2021).
