= Amygdali =

Amygdali may refer to the following places in Greece:

- Amygdali, Karditsa, a town in the Karditsa regional unit
- Ano Amygdali, a village in the Larissa regional unit

== See also ==
- Amygdalea (disambiguation)
