= Krya Vrysi =

Krya Vrysi (Κρύα Βρύση) may refer to several places in Greece:

- Krya Vrysi, Pella, a municipal unit in the Pella regional unit
- Krya Vrysi, Karditsa, a village in the Karditsa regional unit, part of the municipal unit Mitropoli
- Krya Vrysi, Rethymno, a village in the Rethymno regional unit, part of the municipal unit Lampi
- Krya Vrysi, Trikala, a village in the Trikala regional unit, part of the municipality Kalampaka
