= Athamanes =

Athamanes may refer to:

- Athamanes, Karditsa, a municipal unit in Karditsa regional unit, Greece
- Athamanians, an ancient tribe
