= Drakotrypa =

Drakotrypa Δρακότρυπα
- Community
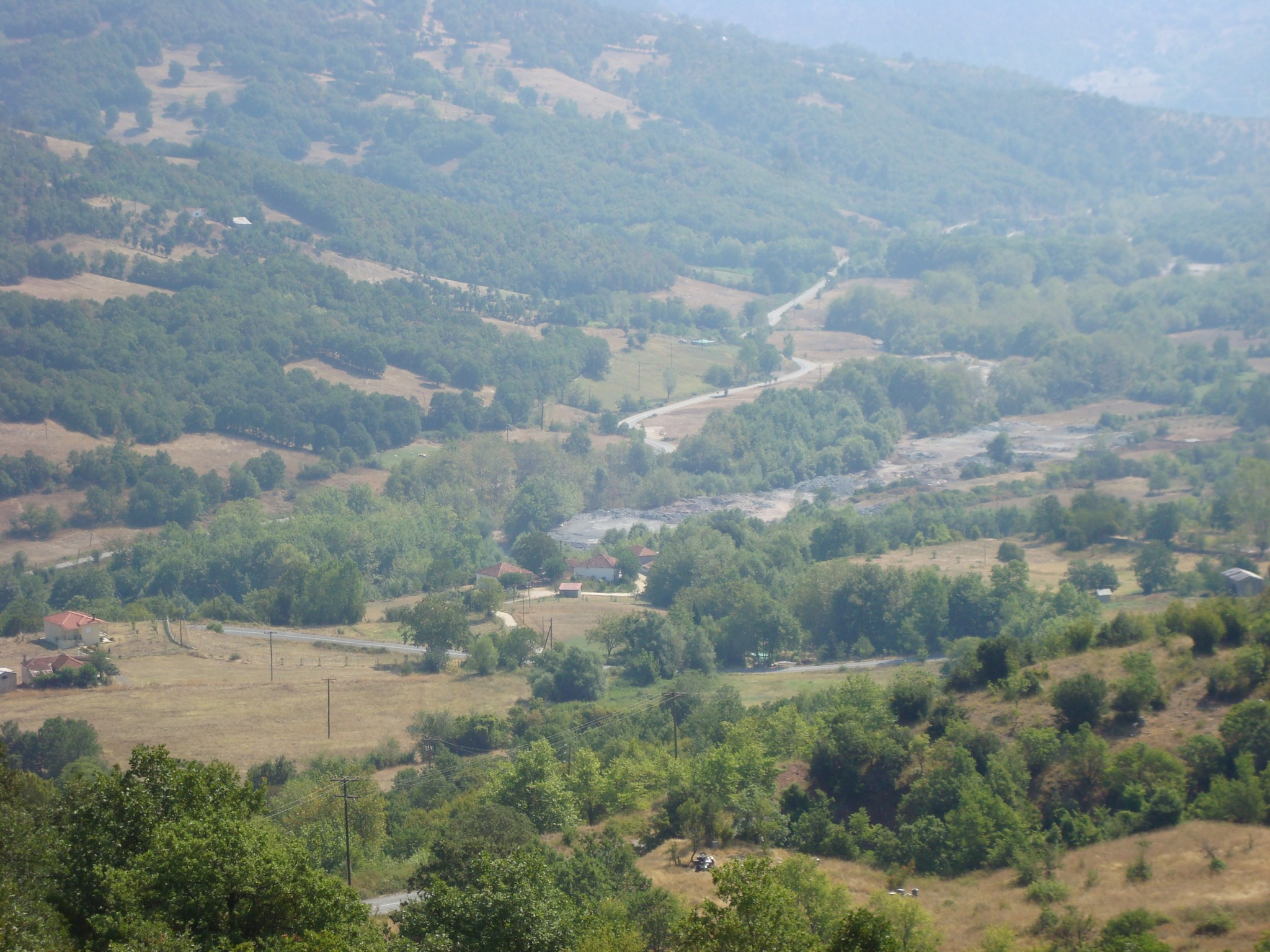
- The village Trygona

- Location within Greece
- Coordinates: 39°24′N 21°36′E
- Country: Greece
- Administrative region: Thessaly
- Regional unit: Karditsa
- Municipality: Mouzaki
- Municipal unit: Mouzaki

Population (2021)
  - Community: 477
- Time zone: UTC+2 (EET)
  - Summer (DST): UTC+3 (EEST)
- Vehicle registration: ΚΑ

Drakotrypa (Greek: Δρακότρυπα) is a mountain village and a community in the municipality of Mouzaki, in the western part of the Karditsa regional unit, Greece. The community consists of the villages Drakotrypa, Arpakia, Keramargio, Milies, Spathes, Trygona and Tsarouchi. Drakotrypa is located at the foot of the Pindus mountains, 6 km southwest of Mouzaki and 28 km west of Karditsa.

== Population ==
Historical population
Year	Pop.	±%
2001	564	—
2011	562	−0.4%
2021	477	−15.1%

== See also ==
- List of settlements in the Karditsa regional unit
