= Ellinopyrgos =

Ellinopyrgos Ελληνόπυργος
- Community
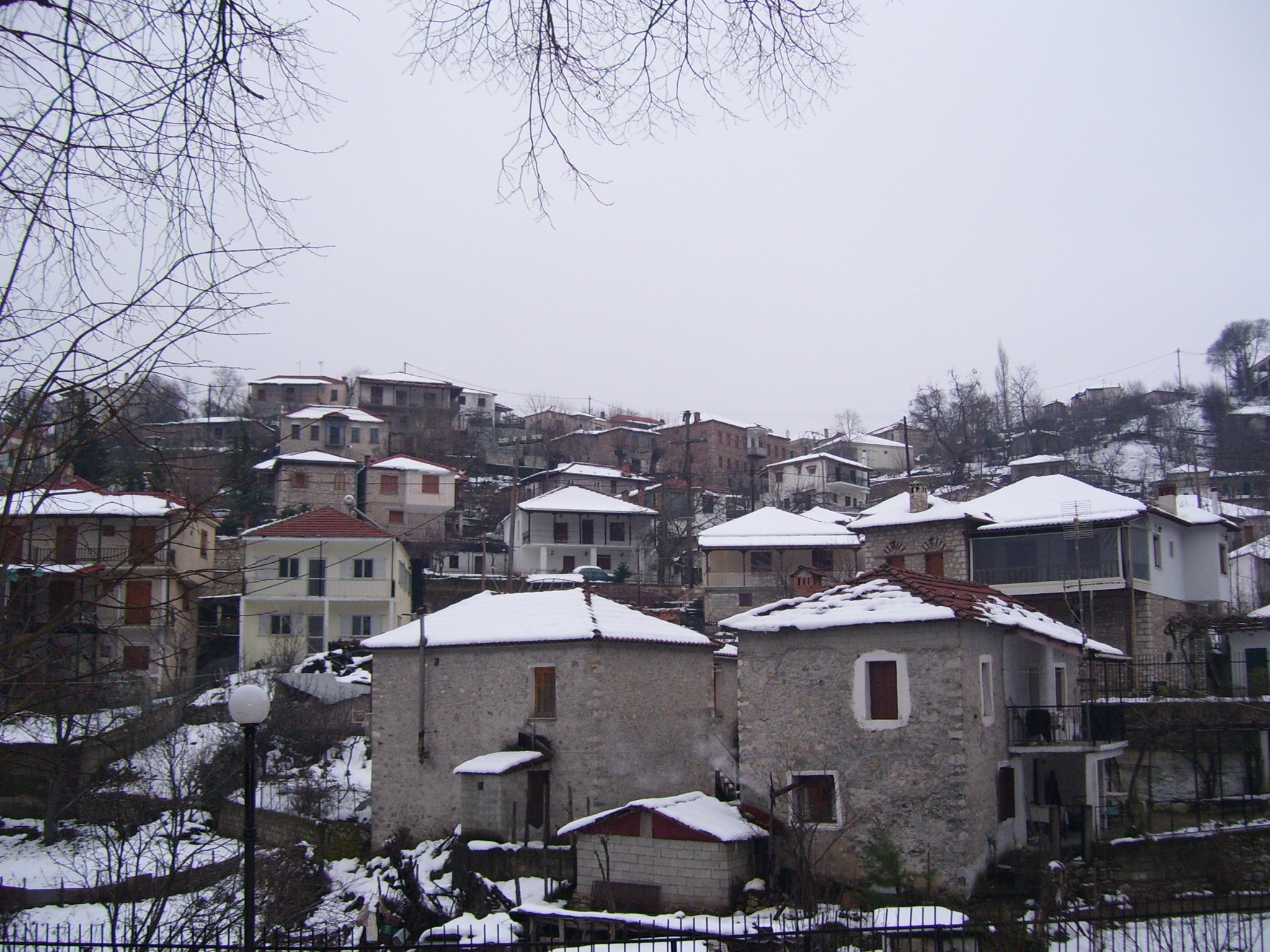

- Location within Greece
- Coordinates: 39°24′N 21°44′E
- Country: Greece
- Administrative region: Thessaly
- Regional unit: Karditsa
- Municipality: Mouzaki
- Municipal unit: Ithomi
- Elevation: 565 m (1,854 ft)

Population (2021)
  - Community: 136
- Time zone: UTC+2 (EET)
  - Summer (DST): UTC+3 (EEST)

Ellinopyrgos (Greek: Ελληνόπυργος), formerly (and occasionally in popular usage) known as Gralista (Γράλιστα), is a village in the central part of Greece with 136 inhabitants in 2021. It is located in the municipality Mouzaki and the regional unit Karditsa in Thessaly.

== History ==
The first reference to the settlement is made in a letter of 1328 discovered by the university professor Nikos Veis in a monastery of Meteora and which mentions the settlement with the name Gradistio. In the following years the village meets the name Gralista. Initially the settlement was lower but due to a plague epidemic that broke out in the middle of the 17th century the surviving inhabitants left their original homes and settled in the livestock settlement located in the current location of the village. The village was included in the treaty that granted autonomy to the so-called Agrafa, a mountainous region in Central Greece during Ottoman times. In the following years it experienced growth based mainly on livestock and textile home industry. During the 18th century, Cosmas of Aetolia visited the area.

Georgios Karaiskakis, a klepht who became a hero in the Greek War of Independence, settled near the village at the age of eight, having been orphaned. He lived in a cave of Lolos near the village. Karaiskakis remained in the village until 1800, when he was 18 years old, having formed his own band of klephts.

During the Greek War of Independence, Ellinopyrgos suffered significant damage. In 1822 the pasha of Trikala, Selichtar, campaigned against Agrafa and destroyed the village. Ellinopyrgos experienced two more disasters. The first was in 1854 during the Crimean War when Thessaly revolted. After the failure of the revolution, Turkish troops completely burned the village. The second catastrophe occurred in 1878 during the new revolution of Thessaly. This time, the damage was smaller. Three years later Thessaly was united with the Kingdom of Greece. In 1928 the settlement was renamed from Gralista to Ellinopyrgos. The name Ellinopyrgos is due to an ancient building that stands at the top of the hill, above the village.

== Topography ==
The Gralisiotis river flew at a 3 km long section through the old village, dividing it into two parts. The wells of the village are the well "Klima" and the well "Mana avrou" while there are many more wells in the location "Athanatos". Kapsouna peak is located at an altitude of 950m, and the peak "Kastri" at an altitude of 907m. In the area "Paxaraki" there is a stream and some small waterfalls.

== Churches ==
The churches of Agios Georgios, Agia Paraskevi and Agios Dimitrios are remarkable architectural monuments of Ellinopyrgos.

- Agios Georgios was the catholic of a small monastery built by the Mount Athos monk Gerasimos Tzortzopoulos in 1818.
- Agia Paraskevi, to honor their patron saint. The church was erected on the site of a previous church that had been burned by the Turks after the revolution of Thessaly in 1854, in which the village also participated.
- The church of Agios Dimitrios, the youngest of the three, was built in 1925 and adorns the eastern district of the village.
