= Oxya, Karditsa =

Oxya Οξυά
- Community
- Location within Greece
- Coordinates: 39°21′N 21°36′E
- Country: Greece
- Administrative region: Thessaly
- Regional unit: Karditsa
- Municipality: Mouzaki
- Municipal unit: Mouzaki

Population (2021)
  - Community: 316
- Time zone: UTC+2 (EET)
  - Summer (DST): UTC+3 (EEST)
- Vehicle registration: ΚΑ

Oxya (Greek: Οξυά) is a mountain village in the western part of the Karditsa regional unit, Greece. Oxya is in the municipality of Mouzaki. Oxya is located about 40 km west of Karditsa and is in the foot of the Pindus mountains. Its residents are based in agriculture.

== Population ==
Year	Village population	Community population
1981	-	847
1991	219	-
2001	189	689
2011	112	368
2021	122	316

== See also ==
- List of settlements in the Karditsa regional unit
