= Pamisos (disambiguation) =

Pamisos is a former municipality in Karditsa prefecture, Greece.

Pamisos may also refer to:

- Pamisos (river), a river in Peloponnese, Greece
- Pamisos (Thessaly river), a river in Thessaly, Greece
- Pamisos Messini, a Greek football club in Messini, Messinia
