= Mesovouni, Karditsa =

Mesovouni Μεσοβούνι
- Community
- Location within Greece
- Coordinates: 39°20′20″N 21°31′15″E
- Country: Greece
- Administrative region: Thessaly
- Regional unit: Karditsa
- Municipality: Argithea
- Municipal unit: Argithea

Population (2021)
  - Community: 72
- Time zone: UTC+2 (EET)
  - Summer (DST): UTC+3 (EEST)
- Vehicle registration: ΚΑ

Mesovouni (Greek: Μεσοβούνι) is a village in the Karditsa regional unit in Thessaly, Greece. It is part of the municipality Argithea.
