= Amygdali, Karditsa =

Amygdali Αμυγδαλή
- Community
- Location within Greece
- Coordinates: 39°23′N 21°42′E
- Country: Greece
- Administrative region: Thessaly
- Regional unit: Karditsa
- Municipality: Mouzaki
- Municipal unit: Mouzaki

Population (2021)
  - Community: 29
- Time zone: UTC+2 (EET)
  - Summer (DST): UTC+3 (EEST)
- Vehicle registration: ΚΑ

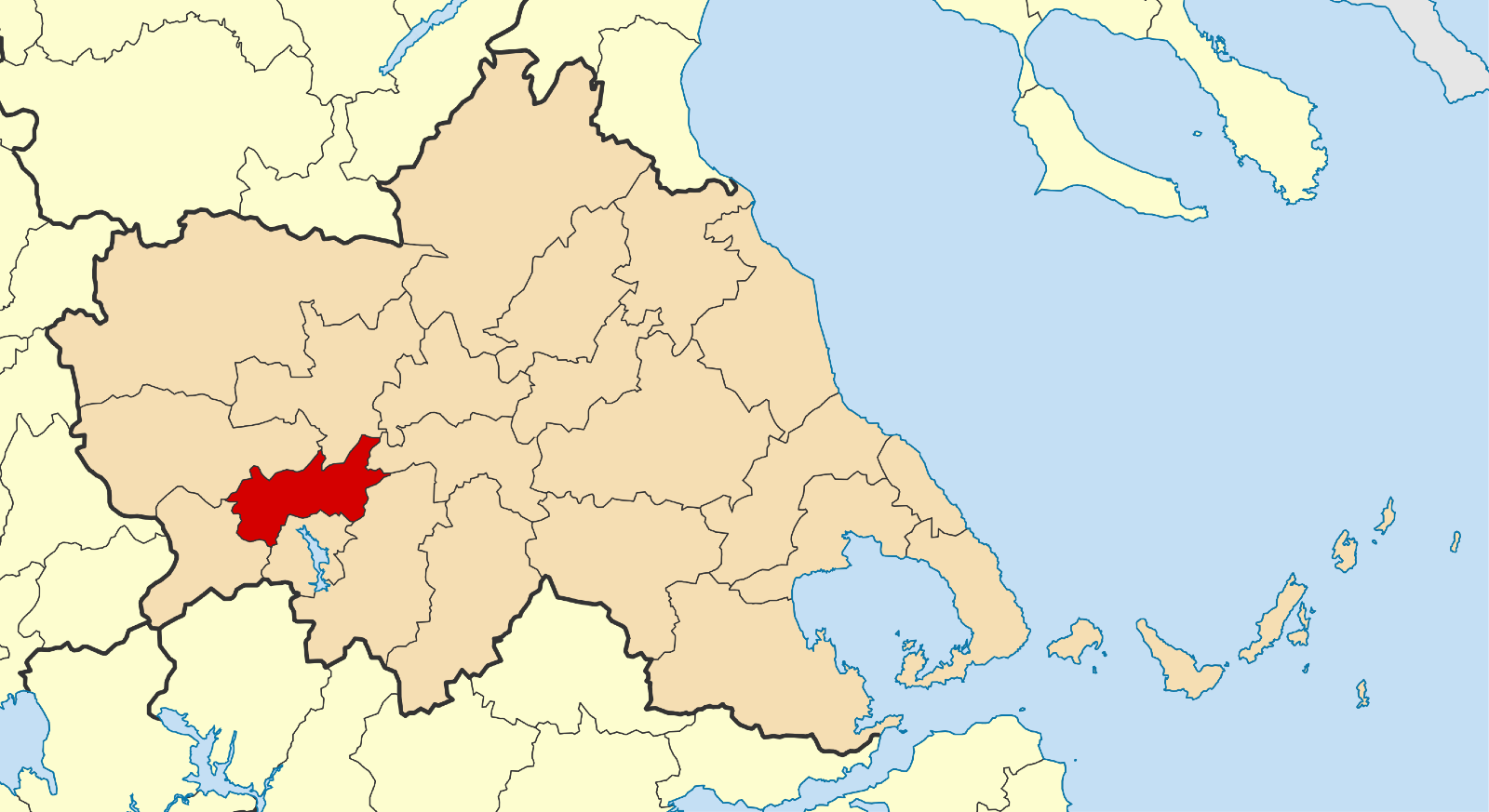

Amygdali (Greek: Αμυγδαλή meaning almond) is a mountain village located west of Karditsa in the western part of the Karditsa regional unit, Greece. Amygdali is in the municipality of Mouzaki. Its residents are based in agriculture.

== Population ==
Historical population
Year	Pop.	±%
1981	90	—
1991	91	+1.1%
2001	76	−16.5%
2011	61	−19.7%
2021	29	−52.5%

== See also ==
- List of settlements in the Karditsa regional unit
