= Acheloos (municipality) =

Acheloos Αχελώος
- Municipal unit
- Location within the regional unit

- Location within Greece
- Coordinates: 39°13′N 21°25′E
- Country: Greece
- Administrative region: Thessaly
- Regional unit: Karditsa
- Municipality: Argithea

Area
  - Municipal unit: 87.4 km^{2} (33.7 sq mi)

Population (2021)
  - Municipal unit: 913
  - Municipal unit density: 10.4/km^{2} (27.1/sq mi)
- Time zone: UTC+2 (EET)
  - Summer (DST): UTC+3 (EEST)
- Vehicle registration: ΚΑ

Acheloos (Greek: Αχελώος) is a former municipality in the Karditsa regional unit, Thessaly, Greece. Since the 2011 local government reform it is part of the municipality Argithea, of which it is a municipal unit. The municipal unit has an area of 87.430 km^{2}. It is named after the Acheloos River. Population 913 (2021). The seat of the municipality was in Vragkiana.
