= Plastiras =

Plastiras Πλαστήρας
- Municipal unit
- Location within the regional unit

- Location within Greece
- Coordinates: 39°21′N 21°45′E
- Country: Greece
- Administrative region: Thessaly
- Regional unit: Karditsa
- Municipality: Lake Plastiras

Area
  - Municipal unit: 93.2 km^{2} (36.0 sq mi)

Population (2021)
  - Municipal unit: 2,872
  - Municipal unit density: 30.8/km^{2} (79.8/sq mi)
- Time zone: UTC+2 (EET)
  - Summer (DST): UTC+3 (EEST)
- Vehicle registration: ΚΑ

Plastiras (Greek: Πλαστήρας, Δήμος Πλαστήρα) is a former municipality in the Karditsa regional unit, Thessaly, Greece. Since the 2011 local government reform it is part of the municipality Lake Plastiras, of which it is a municipal unit. The municipal unit has an area of 93.166 km^{2}. It was named after the Greek general and Prime Minister Nikolaos Plastiras. Lake Plastiras covers a part of the municipal unit. Its residents are engaged chiefly in agriculture. The seat of the municipality was in Morfovouni.

== Subdivisions ==
The municipal unit Plastiras is subdivided into the following communities (constituent villages in brackets):

- Kerasea (Kerasea, Nevropoli)
- Lampero (Lampero, Agios Athanasios)
- Mesenikolas
- Morfovouni (Morfovouni, Razia)
- Moschato (Moschato, Agios Nikolaos, Tsardaki)

== Population ==
Historical population
Year	Pop.	±%
2001	2,365	—
2011	2,412	+2.0%
2021	2,872	+19.1%
