= Arni, Karditsa =

Arni Άρνη
- Municipal unit
- Location within the regional unit

- Location within Greece
- Coordinates: 39°24′N 22°04′E
- Country: Greece
- Administrative region: Thessaly
- Regional unit: Karditsa
- Municipality: Sofades

Area
  - Municipal unit: 89.2 km^{2} (34.4 sq mi)

Population (2021)
  - Municipal unit: 2,140
  - Municipal unit density: 24.0/km^{2} (62.1/sq mi)
- Time zone: UTC+2 (EET)
  - Summer (DST): UTC+3 (EEST)
- Postal code: 433 00
- Vehicle registration: ΚΑ

Arni (Greek: Άρνη) is a former municipality in the Karditsa regional unit, Thessaly, Greece. Since the 2011 local government reform it is part of the municipality Sofades, of which it is a municipal unit. The municipal unit has an area of 89.185 km^{2}. Population 2,140 (2021). The seat of the municipality was in Mataragka. It was named after the ancient Aeolian town of "Arne" (Ancient Greek: Ἄρνη), which was located near present Mataragka.
