= Amygdalea =

Amygdalea or Amygdalia may refer to several places in Greece:

- Amygdalea, Achaea, a village in Paion, Achaea
- Amygdalea, Arcadia, a village in Leonidio, Arcadia
- Amigdalia, Lidoriki, a village in Lidoriki, Phocis regional unit
- Amygdalia, Euboea, a village in Kafireas, Euboea
- Amygdalea, Kozani, a village in the Kozani regional unit
- Amygdalea, Larissa, a village in Koilada, Larissa regional unit
