= Tamasio =

Tamasio Ταμάσιο
- Municipal unit
- Location within the regional unit

- Location within Greece
- Coordinates: 39°12′N 22°08′E
- Country: Greece
- Administrative region: Thessaly
- Regional unit: Karditsa
- Municipality: Sofades

Area
  - Municipal unit: 163.5 km^{2} (63.1 sq mi)

Population (2021)
  - Municipal unit: 2,421
  - Municipal unit density: 14.81/km^{2} (38.35/sq mi)
- Time zone: UTC+2 (EET)
  - Summer (DST): UTC+3 (EEST)
- Vehicle registration: ΚΑ

Tamasio (Greek: Ταμάσιο) is a former municipality in the Karditsa regional unit, Thessaly, Greece. Since the 2011 local government reform it is part of the municipality Sofades, of which it is a municipal unit. The municipal unit has an area of 163.504 km^{2}. Population 2,421 (2021). The seat of the municipality was in Leontari. The municipality was named after Mount Tamassion (Tamasion was also the old name of the village of Anavra).
