= Pamisos =

Pamisos Πάμισος
- Municipal unit
- Location within the regional unit

- Location within Greece
- Coordinates: 39°28′N 21°51′E
- Country: Greece
- Administrative region: Thessaly
- Regional unit: Karditsa
- Municipality: Mouzaki

Area
  - Municipal unit: 53.9 km^{2} (20.8 sq mi)

Population (2021)
  - Municipal unit: 3,176
  - Municipal unit density: 58.9/km^{2} (153/sq mi)
- Time zone: UTC+2 (EET)
  - Summer (DST): UTC+3 (EEST)
- Vehicle registration: ΚΑ

Pamisos (Greek: Πάμισος) is a former municipality in the Karditsa regional unit, Thessaly, Greece, named after Pamisos river. Since the 2011 local government reform it is part of the municipality Mouzaki, of which it is a municipal unit. The municipal unit has an area of 53.854 km^{2}. Population 3,176 (2021). The seat of the municipality was in Agnantero. The municipal unit Pamisos consists of the following communities:

- Agnantero
- Kranea
- Magoula
- Palaiochori
- Rizovouni
