= Amygdalea, Kozani =

Amygdalea Αμυγδαλέα
- Community
- Location within Greece
- Coordinates: 40.244°N 21.904°E
- Country: Greece
- Administrative region: Western Macedonia
- Regional unit: Kozani
- Municipality: Kozani
- Municipal unit: Elimeia
- Elevation: 680 m (2,230 ft)

Population (2021)
  - Community: 73
- Time zone: UTC+2 (EET)
  - Summer (DST): UTC+3 (EEST)
- Postal code: 50010
- Area code: 24610

Amygdalea (Greek: Αμυγδαλέα) is a village in the Elimeia municipal unit, Kozani regional unit, Greece. It is situated at an altitude of 365 meters. The population was 73 at the 2021 census.
