= Ithomi, Karditsa =

Ithomi Ιθώμη
- Municipal unit
- Location within the regional unit

- Location within Greece
- Coordinates: 39°24′N 21°47′E
- Country: Greece
- Administrative region: Thessaly
- Regional unit: Karditsa
- Municipality: Mouzaki

Area
  - Municipal unit: 80.5 km^{2} (31.1 sq mi)

Population (2021)
  - Municipal unit: 1,591
  - Municipal unit density: 19.8/km^{2} (51.2/sq mi)
- Time zone: UTC+2 (EET)
  - Summer (DST): UTC+3 (EEST)
- Vehicle registration: ΚΑ

Ithomi (Greek: Ιθώμη) is a former municipality in the Karditsa regional unit, Thessaly, Greece. Since the 2011 local government reform it is part of the municipality Mouzaki, of which it is a municipal unit. The municipal unit has an area of 80.491 km^{2}. Population 1,591 (2011). The seat of the municipality was in Fanari. The name reflects the ancient town of Ithome, which, although its location is uncertain, is thought to be located nearby. The municipal unit Ithomi consists of the following communities:

- Agios Akakios
- Charma
- Ellinopyrgos
- Fanari
- Kanalia
- Kappas
- Loxada
- Pyrgos Ithomis
