= Menelaida =

Menelaida Μενελαΐδα
- Municipal unit
- Location within the regional unit

- Location within Greece
- Coordinates: 39°09′N 22°01′E
- Country: Greece
- Administrative region: Thessaly
- Regional unit: Karditsa
- Municipality: Sofades

Area
  - Municipal unit: 169.8 km^{2} (65.6 sq mi)

Population (2021)
  - Municipal unit: 1,514
  - Municipal unit density: 8.916/km^{2} (23.09/sq mi)
- Time zone: UTC+2 (EET)
  - Summer (DST): UTC+3 (EEST)
- Vehicle registration: ΚΑ

Menelaida (Greek: Μενελαΐδα) is a former municipality in the Karditsa regional unit, Thessaly, Greece, named after the ancient city of "Menelais" or "Menelaida", near Loutropigi. Since the 2011 local government reform it is part of the municipality Sofades, of which it is a municipal unit. The municipal unit has an area of 169.840 km^{2}. As of 2021 the population was 1,514. The seat of the municipality was in Kedros.
