= Sofades =

Sofades Σοφάδες
- Municipality
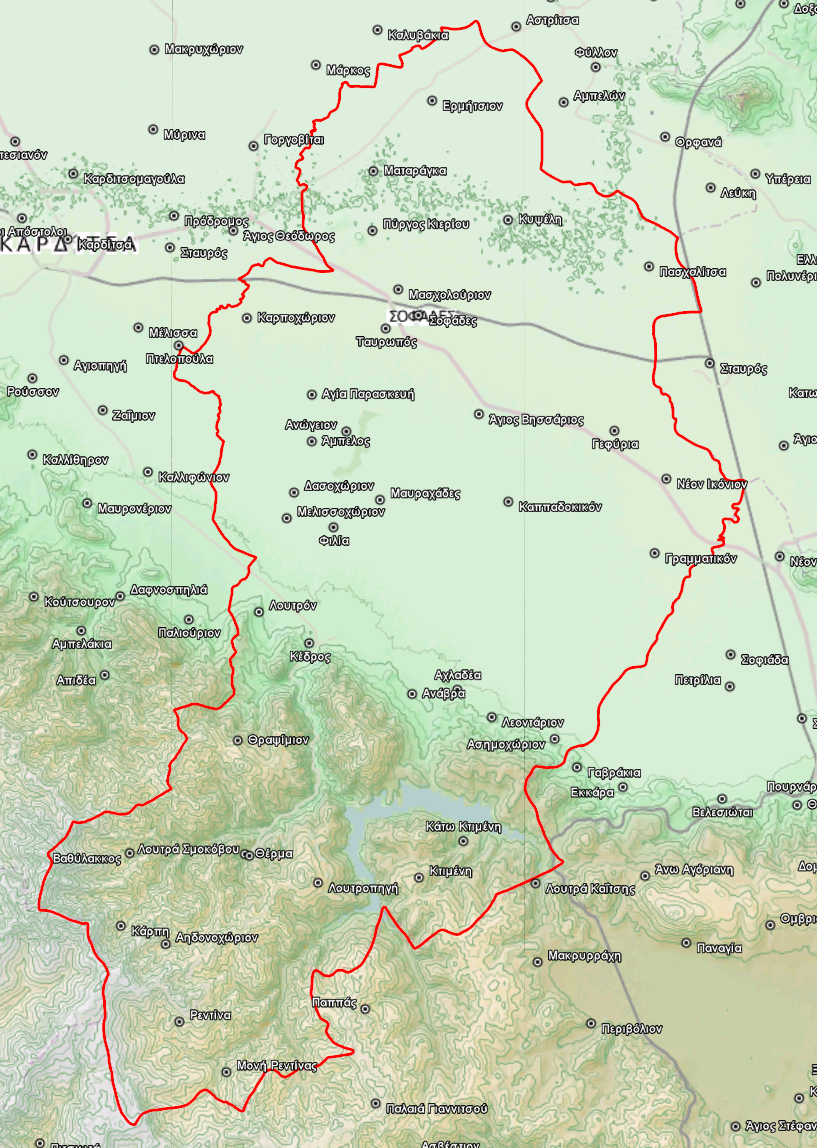

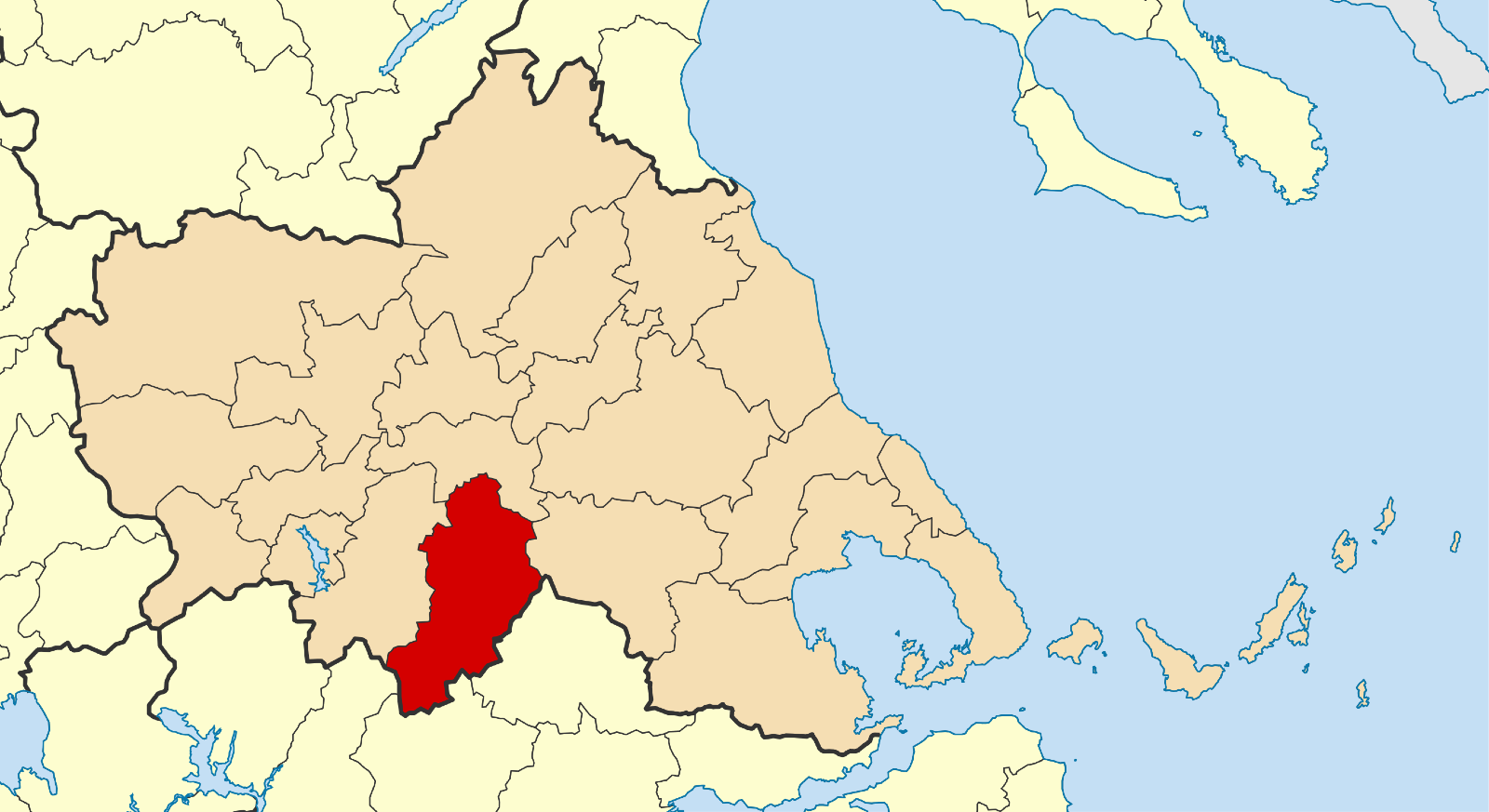

- Location within Greece
- Coordinates: 39°20′N 22°06′E
- Country: Greece
- Administrative region: Thessaly
- Regional unit: Karditsa

Area
  - Municipality: 720.8 km^{2} (278.3 sq mi)
  - Municipal unit: 241.3 km^{2} (93.2 sq mi)

Population (2021)
  - Municipality: 16,927
  - Density: 23.48/km^{2} (60.82/sq mi)
  - Municipal unit: 10,591
  - Municipal unit density: 43.89/km^{2} (113.7/sq mi)
  - Community: 6,269
- Time zone: UTC+2 (EET)
  - Summer (DST): UTC+3 (EEST)
- Vehicle registration: ΚΑ

Sofades (Greek: Σοφάδες) is a town and municipality in Thessaly, central Greece belonging to the regional unit of Karditsa. Its 2011 census population was 6,056 people and 18,864 for the municipality, including a large Romani community. Its elevation is around 120 m above sea level, and the economy is mainly agricultural (cotton, corn). Sofades is located south of Palamas, southwest of Larissa, the capital of Thessaly, northwest of Lamia and southeast of Karditsa and Trikala. The native Greek inhabitants of the region are commonly known as Karagounides (Καραγκούνηδες).

== History ==
The modern town is very close to the site of the ancient city of Kierion (Greek: Κιέριον) or Cierium, one of the most important cities of ancient Thessaly. The name "Sofades" was first recorded as "Sofou" (Σοφού) around 1454 AD. In the early 1800s, the English traveler William Martin Leake described the town as an administrative center consisting of around 150 houses and belonging to Abdim Bey of Larissa, but paying a yearly tribute to Ali Pasha. Chief crops of the region were corn and sesame, from which the oil was a major product.

== Municipality ==
The municipality Sofades was formed at the 2011 local government reform by the merger of the following 5 former municipalities, that became municipal units:

- Arni
- Menelaida
- Rentina
- Sofades
- Tamasio

The municipality has an area of 720.752 km^{2}, the municipal unit 241.255 km^{2}.

=== Subdivisions ===
The municipal unit of Sofades is divided into the following communities:

- Agia Paraskevi
- Agios Vissarios
- Ampelos
- Anogeio
- Dasochori
- Filia
- Gefyria
- Kappadokiko
- Karpochori
- Mascholouri
- Melissochori
- Paschalitsa
- Sofades (Sofades, Tavropos)

== Population ==
| Year | Community | Municipal unit | Municipality |
|---|---|---|---|
| 1981 | 5,078 | - | - |
| 1991 | 5,415 | - | - |
| 2001 | 6,106 | 12,215 | - |
| 2011 | 6,056 | 11,153 | 18,864 |
| 2021 | 6,269 | 10,591 | 16,927 |

== Transport ==
Sofades is on Greek National Road 30 (Karditsa - Domokos - Volos), and the A3 motorway (Xyniada - Karditsa - Trikala) passes west of the town. The town is served by Sofades railway station on the Palaiofarsalos–Kalambaka railway, with services to Palaiofarsalos, Larissa, Thessaloniki, Kalambaka and Athens.
