= Nevropoli Agrafon =

Nevropoli Agrafon Νευρόπολη Αγράφων
- Municipal unit
- Location within the regional unit

- Location within Greece
- Coordinates: 39°17′N 21°42′E
- Country: Greece
- Administrative region: Thessaly
- Regional unit: Karditsa
- Municipality: Lake Plastiras

Area
  - Municipal unit: 105.2 km^{2} (40.6 sq mi)

Population (2021)
  - Municipal unit: 2,362
  - Municipal unit density: 22.45/km^{2} (58.15/sq mi)
- Time zone: UTC+2 (EET)
  - Summer (DST): UTC+3 (EEST)
- Vehicle registration: ΚΑ

Nevropoli Agrafon (Greek: Νευρόπολη Αγράφων) is a former municipality in the Karditsa regional unit, Thessaly, Greece. Since the 2011 local government reform it is part of the municipality Lake Plastiras, of which it is a municipal unit. The municipal unit has an area of 105.184 km^{2}. Population 2,362 (2021). The seat of the municipality was in Pezoula. The municipality's name derives from the ancient city of "Nevròpolis" of the Agrafa Mountains.
