= Anatoliki Argithea =

Anatoliki Argithea Ανατολική Αργιθέα
- Municipal unit
- Location within the regional unit

- Location within Greece
- Coordinates: 39°17′N 21°33′E
- Country: Greece
- Administrative region: Thessaly
- Regional unit: Karditsa
- Municipality: Argithea

Area
  - Municipal unit: 135.1 km^{2} (52.2 sq mi)

Population (2021)
  - Municipal unit: 1,162
  - Municipal unit density: 8.601/km^{2} (22.28/sq mi)
- Time zone: UTC+2 (EET)
  - Summer (DST): UTC+3 (EEST)
- Vehicle registration: ΚΑ

Anatoliki Argithea (Greek: Ανατολική Αργιθέα, "Eastern Argithea", before 2001: Αθαμάνες - Athamanes) is a former community in the Karditsa regional unit, Thessaly, Greece. Since the 2011 local government reform, it is part of the municipality Argithea, of which it is a municipal unit. The municipal unit has an area of 135.070 km^{2}. Population 1,162 (2021). The seat of the community was in Petrilo.
