= Lake Plastiras (municipality) =

Lake Plastiras Λίμνη Πλαστήρα
- Municipality
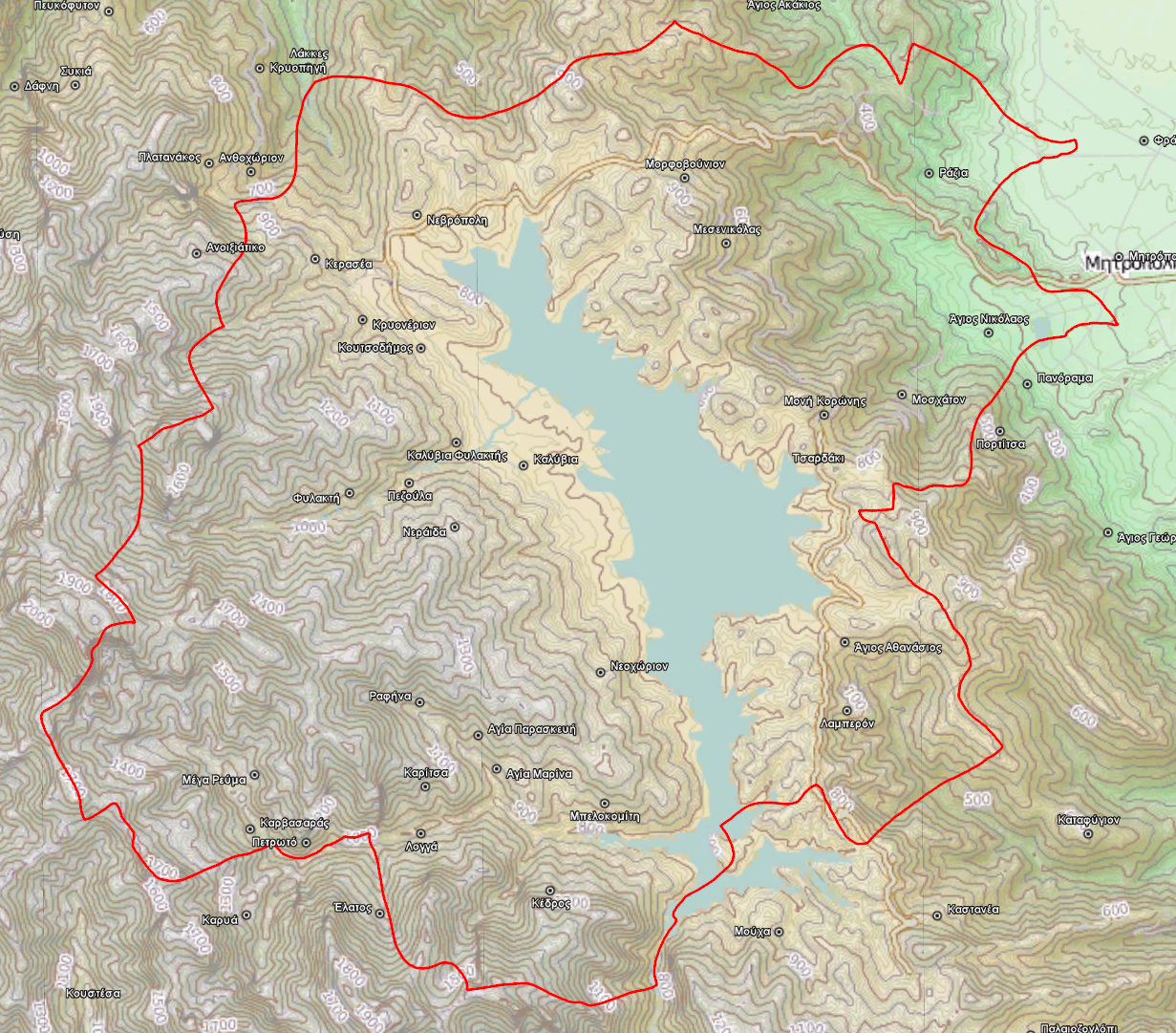

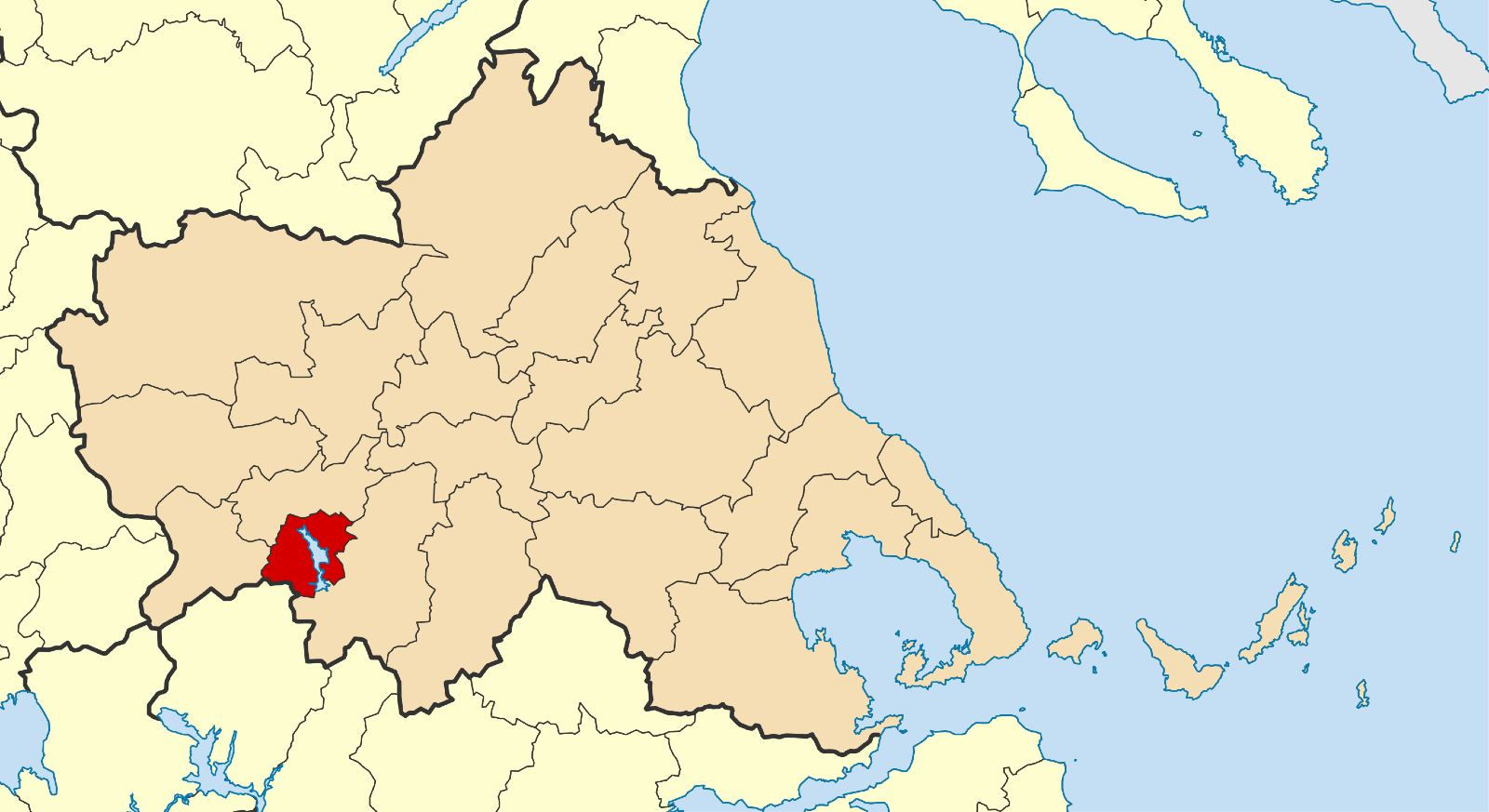

- Location within Greece
- Coordinates: 39°21′N 21°45′E
- Country: Greece
- Administrative region: Thessaly
- Regional unit: Karditsa
- Seat: Morfovouni

Area
  - Municipality: 198.4 km^{2} (76.6 sq mi)

Population (2021)
  - Municipality: 5,234
  - Density: 26.38/km^{2} (68.33/sq mi)
- Time zone: UTC+2 (EET)
  - Summer (DST): UTC+3 (EEST)

Lake Plastiras (Greek: Λίμνη Πλαστήρα) is a municipality in the Karditsa regional unit, Thessaly, Greece. The seat of the municipality is the town Morfovouni. The municipal unit has an area of 198.350 km^{2}. The municipality was named after the artificial Lake Plastiras, that was named in turn after the Greek general and three-time prime minister Nikolaos Plastiras.

== Municipality ==
The municipality Lake Plastiras was formed at the 2011 local government reform by the merger of the following 2 former municipalities, that became municipal units:

- Nevropoli Agrafon
- Plastiras
