= Mitropoli =

Mitropoli Μητρόπολη
- Municipal unit
- Location within the regional unit

- Location within Greece
- Coordinates: 39°20′N 21°50′E
- Country: Greece
- Administrative region: Thessaly
- Regional unit: Karditsa
- Municipality: Karditsa

Area
  - Municipal unit: 57.9 km^{2} (22.4 sq mi)

Population (2021)
  - Municipal unit: 2,892
  - Municipal unit density: 49.9/km^{2} (129/sq mi)
  - Community: 1,113
- Time zone: UTC+2 (EET)
  - Summer (DST): UTC+3 (EEST)
- Vehicle registration: ΚΑ

Mitropoli (Greek: Μητρόπολη, before 1915: Παληόκαστρον - Paliokastron) is a village and a former municipality in the Karditsa regional unit, Thessaly, Greece. Since the 2011 local government reform it is part of the municipality Karditsa, of which it is a municipal unit. The municipal unit has an area of 57.894 km^{2}. Population 2,892 (2021). The village, the site of the ancient city of Metropolis, was renamed in 1915 to reflect the association.
