= Mouzaki =

Mouzaki Μουζάκι
- Municipality
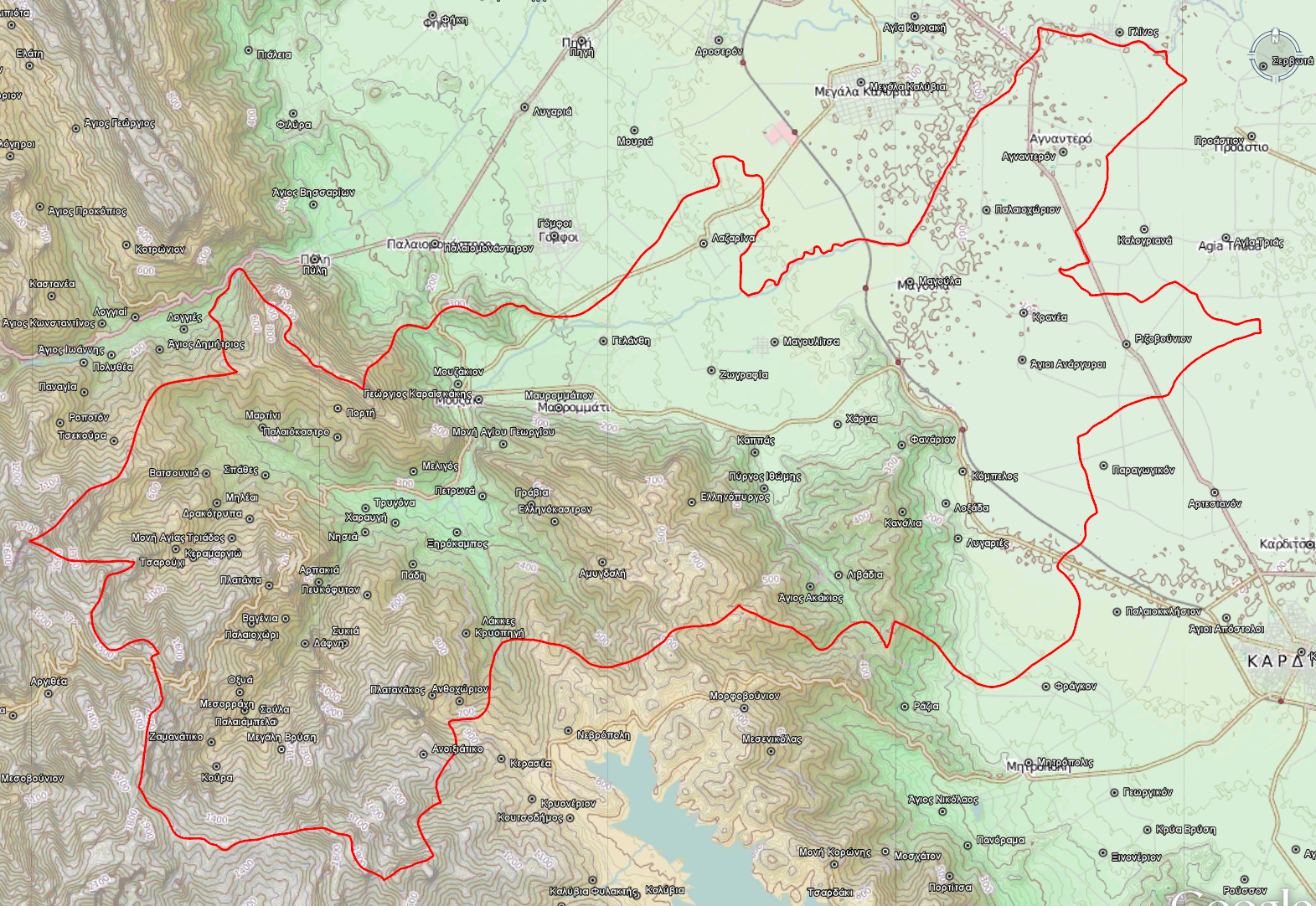
- Mouzaki municipality map

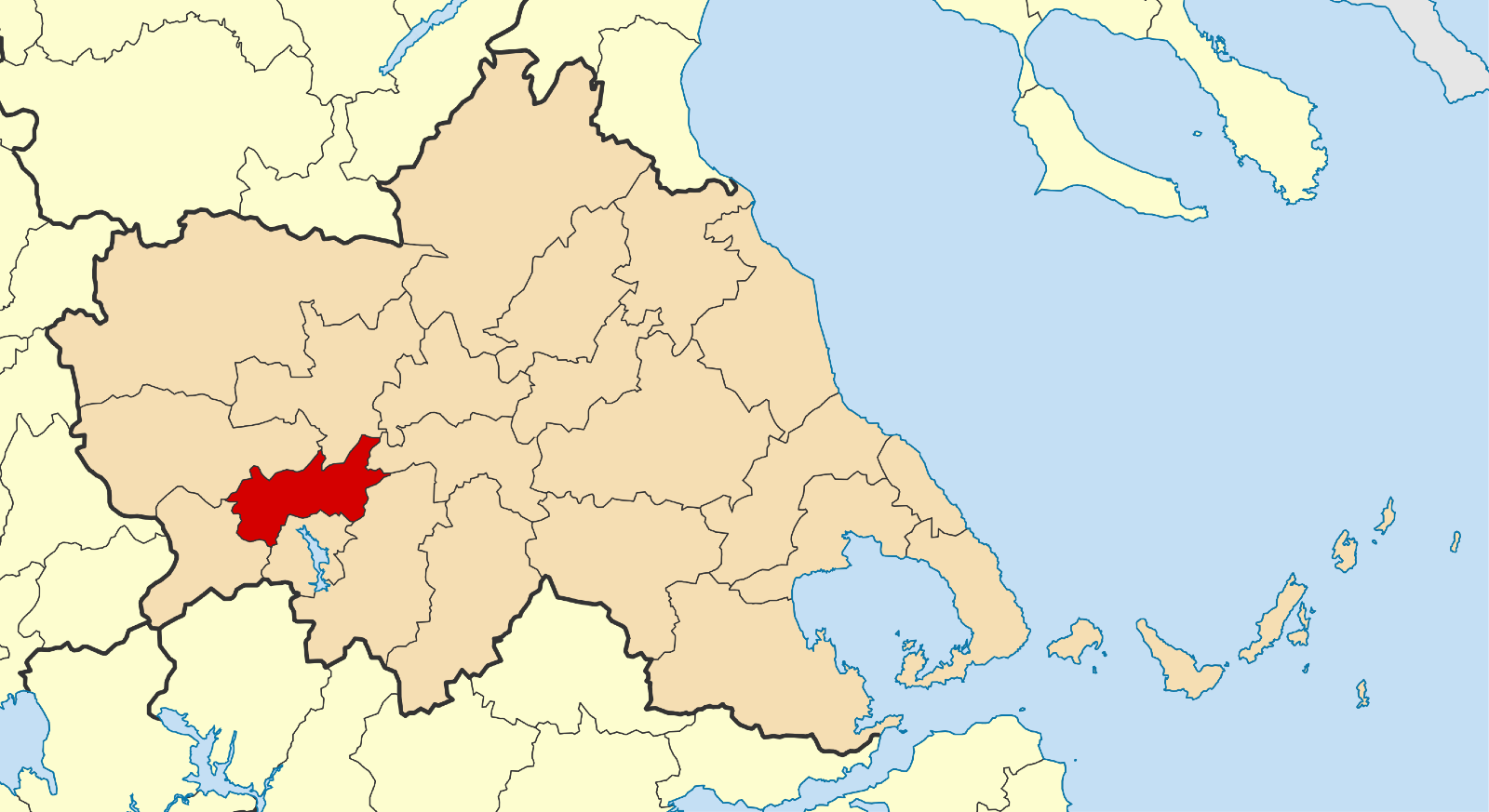

- Location within Greece
- Coordinates: 39°26′N 21°40′E
- Country: Greece
- Administrative region: Thessaly
- Regional unit: Karditsa

Area
  - Municipality: 313.9 km^{2} (121.2 sq mi)
  - Municipal unit: 179.5 km^{2} (69.3 sq mi)

Population (2021)
  - Municipality: 11,245
  - Density: 35.82/km^{2} (92.78/sq mi)
  - Municipal unit: 6,478
  - Municipal unit density: 36.09/km^{2} (93.47/sq mi)
  - Community: 1,838
- Time zone: UTC+2 (EET)
  - Summer (DST): UTC+3 (EEST)
- Vehicle registration: ΚΑ

Mouzaki (Greek: Μουζάκι, romanized: Mouzáki) is a town and a municipality in the northwestern part of the Karditsa regional unit, Greece. Mouzaki is located on the southwestern edge of the Thessalian plain, where the river Pamisos descends from the Agrafa mountains. It is 17 km southwest of Trikala and 24 km northwest of Karditsa. The Greek National Road 30 (Arta - Trikala - Karditsa - Volos) passes north of the town. In 2020, Mouzaki was heavily affected by the medicane known as Cyclone Ianos. The town was flooded for several days.

== Municipality ==
The municipality Mouzaki was formed at the 2011 local government reform by the merger of the following 3 former municipalities, that became municipal units:

- Ithomi
- Mouzaki
- Pamisos

The municipality has an area of 313.866 km^{2}, the municipal unit 179.521 km^{2}.

=== Subdivisions ===
The municipal unit of Mouzaki is divided into the following communities (constituent settlements in brackets):

- Amygdali
- Anthochori (Anthochori, Anoixiatiko, Platanakos)
- Drakotrypa (Drakotrypa, Arpakia, Keramargio, Milies, Spathes, Trygona, Tsarouchi)
- Ellinokastro (Ellinokastro, Gravia, Petrota)
- Gelanthi
- Kryopigi (Kryopigi, Lakkes, Xirokampos)
- Lazarina
- Magoulitsa
- Mavrommati (Mavrommati, Georgios Karaiskakis)
- Mouzaki
- Oxya (Oxya, Vagenia, Dafni, Zamanatiko, Koura, Megali Vrysi, Mesorrachi, Palaiampela, Palaiochori, Platania, Soula, Sykia)
- Pefkofyto (Pefkofyto, Nisia, Padi, Charavgi)
- Porti (Porti, Martini, Meligos, Palaiokastro)
- Vatsounia

== Population ==
Year	Town	Municipal unit	Municipality
1981	2,560	-	-
1991	2,353	-	-
2001	2,190	10,148	-
2011	1,961	7,291	13,122
2021	1,838	6,478	11,245

== Sport ==
Not far from the town is one of the most popular climbing sites and venuvenues in Greece, the Mouzaki crag. the crag creates a natural balcony overlooking the Pamisos river.
