= Karditsa (regional unit) =

Karditsa Περιφερειακή ενότητα Καρδίτσας
- Regional unit
- Municipalities of Karditsa

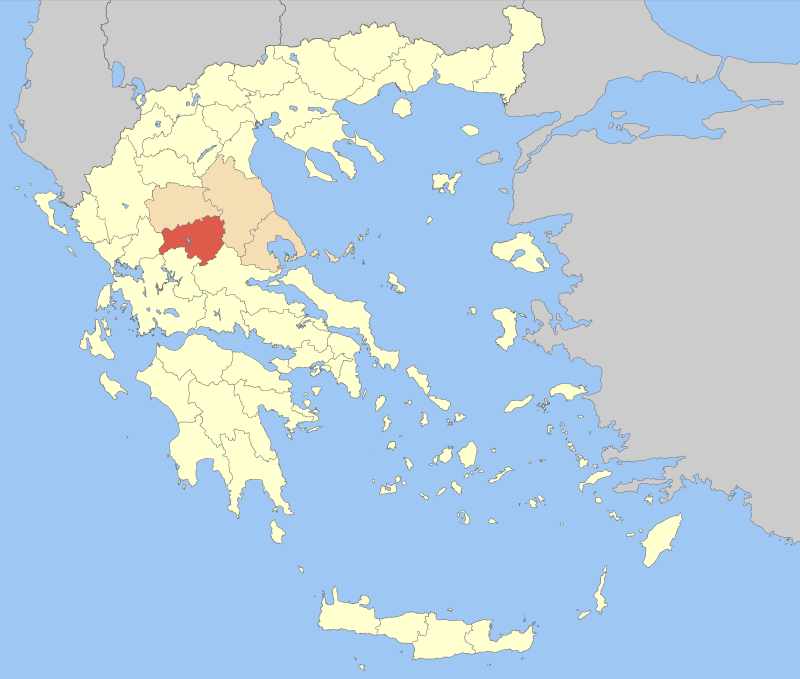
- Karditsa within Greece

- Location within Greece
- Coordinates: 39°20′N 22°00′E
- Country: Greece
- Administrative region: Thessaly
- Seat: Karditsa

Area
  - Total: 2,636 km^{2} (1,018 sq mi)

Population (2021)
  - Total: 106,305
  - Density: 40.33/km^{2} (104.4/sq mi)
- Time zone: UTC+2 (EET)
  - Summer (DST): UTC+3 (EEST)
- Postal code: 43x xx
- Area code: 244x0
- Vehicle registration: ΚΑ

Karditsa (Greek: Περιφερειακή ενότητα Καρδίτσας, [karˈðit͡sa]) is one of the regional units of Greece. It is part of the region of Thessaly. Its name is derived from its capital Karditsa, a town of approximately 56,000 people.

== Administration ==
The regional unit Karditsa is subdivided into 6 municipalities. These are (number as in the map in the infobox):

- Argithea (2)
- Karditsa (1)
- Lake Plastiras (Limni Plastiras, 3)
- Mouzaki (4)
- Palamas (5)
- Sofades (6)

=== Prefecture ===
Karditsa was created as a prefecture (Greek: Νομός Καρδίτσας) in 1899, and again in 1947. As a part of the 2011 Kallikratis government reform, the regional unit Karditsa was created out of the former prefecture Karditsa. The prefecture had the same territory as the present regional unit. At the same time, the municipalities were reorganised, according to the table below.

New municipality	Old municipalities	Seat
Argithea	Argithea	Anthiro
Argithea	Anatoliki Argithea	Anthiro
Argithea	Acheloos	Anthiro
Karditsa	Karditsa	Karditsa
Karditsa	Itamos	Karditsa
Karditsa	Kallifoni	Karditsa
Karditsa	Kampos	Karditsa
Karditsa	Mitropoli	Karditsa
Lake Plastiras (Limni Plastiras)	Plastiras	Morfovouni
Lake Plastiras (Limni Plastiras)	Nevropoli Agrafon	Morfovouni
Mouzaki	Mouzaki	Mouzaki
Mouzaki	Ithomi	Mouzaki
Mouzaki	Pamisos	Mouzaki
Palamas	Palamas	Palamas
Palamas	Sellana	Palamas
Palamas	Fyllo	Palamas
Sofades	Sofades	Sofades
Sofades	Arni	Sofades
Sofades	Menelaida	Sofades
Sofades	Rentina	Sofades
Sofades	Tamasio	Sofades

== History ==
Encompassing the ancient geographical region of Thessaliotis, one of the four ancient districts of Thessaly, the present day Karditsa regional unit was in the Kingdom of Macedonia and later the Roman Empire, the Byzantine Empire, the Ottoman Empire from the 15th century until 1881 and finally Greece after the liberation of Thessaly. Its economy and agriculture boomed during that period; Karditsa was administered as the Trikala–Karditsa prefecture until 1947. It was affected by World War II and the Greek Civil War which saw many buildings destroyed and inhabitants left homeless and in hiding. The prefecture was later rebuilt and received electricity, appliances and motorised transport, while emigration also began in the 1950s, when construction of Lake Plastiras was added. Television arrived in the 1970s and the 1980s for its villages, and its economy later declined, seeing high unemployment in the prefecture.

== Population ==
The population was 121,775 in 2001.

The plains of central and southern Karditsa are inhabited by the Karagounides (Greek: Καραγκούνηδες), while the Agrafa mountains in the west of the prefecture are dominated by a strong Sarakatsani (Greek: Σαρακατσάνοι) and Aromanian, or Vlach (Greek: Βλάχοι - Vlahi), element.

=== Culture and education ===
The Public Market of Karditsa is one of UNESCO's protected cultural monuments.

The city is also an important knowledge centre, supporting the Faculty of Veterinary Medicine, the Public and Community Health, Forestry and Wood Sciences, and Science of Foods and Nutrition, departments of the University of Thessaly. There is also a Police Academy.

=== Sporting teams ===
- Anagennisi Karditsa (football) - Karditsa (city) - second division
- A.O. Karditsa - Karditsa - local division
- Iraklis Sofades - Sofades
- Tavropos - Karditsa - fourth division

=== Notable residents ===
Archbishops:

- Damaskinos of Athens
- Seraphim of Athens Archbishop of Athens and all Greece

Athletes:

- Ioannis Bourousis
- Ekaterini Koffa
- Labros Papakostas
- Dimosthenis Tampakos
- Konstantinos Thanos
- Dimitrios Tsiamis

Military:

- Georgios Karaiskakis

Politicians:

- Charilaos Florakis
- Nikolaos Plastiras
- Dimitris Sioufas
- Spyros Taliadouros

Singers:

- Elena Paparizou
- Efi Thodi

Others:

- George Mitsikostas - Comedian
- Vassilis Papazachos - Seismologist

== Famous Personalities from Karditsa ==
Antigoni Drisbioti, Helena Paparizou, Dimitris Mitropanos, Fotini Velesiotu, Dionisis Tsaknis, Kostas Kafasis, Konstantinos Thanos, Ioannis Bourousis, Nina Kaloutsa, Sakis Tsiolis, Vaios Karagiannis, Mimis Gkioulekas, Charilaos Florakis, G.Mpaltadoros, G.Siantos, N. Plastiras,

== Transport ==
The Palaiofarsalos–Kalambaka railway passes through the regional unit, with the main railway stations in Karditsa and Sofades. The main roads in the unit are the A3 motorway, EO30, and the Larissa–Karditsa road corridor (part of Karditsa Provincial Road 17 and Larissa Provincial Road 28).

== See also ==
- List of settlements in the Karditsa regional unit
