= 221 BC =

221 BC in various calendars
Gregorian calendar	221 BC; CCXXI BC
Ab urbe condita	533
Ancient Egypt era	XXXIII dynasty, 103
Pharaoh	Ptolemy IV Philopator, 1
Ancient Greek Olympiad (summer)	139th Olympiad, year 4
Assyrian calendar	4530
Balinese saka calendar	N/A
Bengali calendar	−814 – −813
Berber calendar	730
Buddhist calendar	324
Burmese calendar	−858
Byzantine calendar	5288–5289
Chinese calendar	己卯年 (Earth Rabbit); 2477 or 2270 — to — 庚辰年 (Metal Dragon); 2478 or 2271
Coptic calendar	−504 – −503
Discordian calendar	946
Ethiopian calendar	−228 – −227
Hebrew calendar	3540–3541
- Hindu calendars
Vikram Samvat	−164 – −163
Shaka Samvat	N/A
Kali Yuga	2880–2881
Holocene calendar	9780
Iranian calendar	842 BP – 841 BP
Islamic calendar	868 BH – 867 BH
Javanese calendar	N/A
Julian calendar	N/A
Korean calendar	2113
Minguo calendar	2132 before ROC 民前2132年
Nanakshahi calendar	−1688
Seleucid era	91/92 AG
Thai solar calendar	322–323
Tibetan calendar	阴土兔年 (female Earth-Rabbit) −94 or −475 or −1247 — to — 阳金龙年 (male Iron-Dragon) −93 or −474 or −1246

Year 221 BC was a year of the pre-Julian Roman calendar. At the time it was known in Rome as the Year of the Consulship of Asina and Rufus/Lepidus (or, less frequently, year 533 Ab urbe condita). The denomination 221 BC for this year has been used since the early medieval period, when the Anno Domini calendar era became the prevalent method in Europe for naming years.

== Events ==
=== By place ===
==== Iberian Peninsula ====
- The Carthaginian general Hasdrubal is murdered by a Celtic assassin while campaigning to increase the Carthaginian hold on Spain. Following the assassination of Hasdrubal, Hannibal, the son of the Carthaginian general, Hamilcar Barca, is proclaimed commander-in-chief by the army and his appointment is confirmed by the Carthaginian government.
- Hannibal immediately moves to consolidate Carthage's control of Spain. He marries a Spanish princess, Imilce, then begins to conquer various Spanish tribes. He fights against the Olcades and captures their capital, Althaea; quells the Vaccaei in the northwest; and, making the seaport of Cartagena (Carthago Nova, the capital of Carthaginian Spain) his base, wins a resounding victory over the Carpetani in the region of the Tagus River.

==== Egypt ====
- Egypt's Ptolemy III dies and is succeeded by his son, Ptolemy IV. Sosibius is appointed by Ptolemy IV as his chief minister and immediately has a great influence over the young king, directing all of the affairs of state.
- At Sosibius' direction, Ptolemy IV puts to death in succession his uncle, Lysimachus, his brother Magas, and his mother Berenice II.
- King Cleomenes III of Sparta, who is in exile in Egypt, is imprisoned by Ptolemy IV on a charge of conspiracy.

==== Seleucid Empire ====
- The satrap of Media, Molon, and his brother, Alexander, revolt against Antiochus III, primarily due to their hatred towards Hermeias, Antiochus' chief minister. Molon is able to become master of the Seleucid domains to the east of the Tigris. He is stopped by Antiochus III's forces in his attempts to pass that river. Xenoetas, one of Antiochus' generals, is sent against Molon with a large force, but is surprised by Molon's forces and his whole army is cut to pieces and Xenoetas is killed. The rebel satrap now crosses the Tigris, and makes himself master of the city of Seleucia on the Tigris, together with the whole of Babylonia and Mesopotamia.

==== Greece ====
- Antigonus III dies during a battle against the Illyrians and is succeeded by his young cousin Philip V as King of Macedonia.

==== Roman Republic ====
- Gaius Flaminius builds a second race track for Rome, the Circus Flaminius.

==== China ====
- The state of Qi – by now the only other independent state in China –, is invaded by the Qin generals Wang Ben, Li Xin and Meng Tian and surrenders after offering minimal resistance. Ying Zheng, the king of Qin unifies China and proclaims himself the First Emperor, as he is the first Chinese sovereign able to rule the whole country, thus ending the Warring States period. He is known by historians as Qin Shi Huang.
- The Chinese Bronze Age ends (approximate date).

== Births ==
- Liu Fei, Chinese prince and proclaimed king of the former Qi State (d. 189 BC)

== Deaths ==
- Antigonus III Doson, king of Macedon from 227 BC (b. 263 BC)
- Berenice II, queen of Egypt, daughter of Magas, king of Cyrenaica (in modern Libya), whose marriage to Ptolemy III Euergetes has reunited her country with Egypt (b. c. 267 BC)
- Hasdrubal, Carthaginian general and son-in-law of Hamilcar Barca (assassinated) (b. c. 270 BC)
- Lucius Caecilius Metellus, Roman consul and general during the First Punic War (b. c. 290 BC)
- Ptolemy III, king of Egypt, who has reunited Egypt and Cyrenaica and successfully waged the Third Syrian War against the Seleucid Empire
- Xenoetas, Seleucid general (killed during a revolt against Antiochus III)
