= Theodotus of Aetolia =

Aetolian mercenary commander

Theodotus (Greek: Θεόδοτος) was an Aetolian mercenary commander, who at the accession of the Seleucid monarch, Antiochus III the Great (223–187 BC), was in Ptolemaic service and held the command of the important province of Coele-Syria for Ptolemy Philopator (221–204 BC), king of Egypt.

Theodotus was an able general, easily repulsing the first attack of king Antiochus upon his province, but instead of being rewarded by Ptolemy for his services, he was recalled to Alexandria, where he nearly fell a victim to the intrigues of some of the courtiers and favourites of the king. Disgusted with this treatment, and despising the vices and luxury of Ptolemy, when he did resume command in Coele-Syria (219 BC), Theodotus conceived the idea of passing that province into the hands of Antiochus. His overtures were readily welcomed, and he surrendered the two important fortresses of Tyre and Ptolemais to the Seleucid monarch, whom he immediately joined with the forces under his command. Another of Ptolemy's generals, Nicolaus, prevented Theodotus' plans from being fully effected, and he was able to retain a part of the Syrian provinces under the allegiance of Egypt.

Theodotus enjoyed a high place in the favour with the Seleucid king. In the campaign of 217 BC, Theodotus commanded a body of ten thousand select troops, and just before the Battle of Raphia he demonstrated his daring by penetrating with only two companions into the heart of the Egyptian camp, in order to assassinate Ptolemy himself. Mistaking the king's tent, Theodotus slew Ptolemy's physician instead, but escaped safely, returning to the Seleucid camp.

Again in 215 BC Theodotus exhibited equal audacity in supporting the daring project of Lagoras to scale the walls of the city of Sardis, the success of which seems to have been in great measure owing to Theodotus' skill and ability.
