= 220 BC =

220 BC in various calendars
- Gregorian calendar: 220 BC; CCXX BC
- Ab urbe condita: 534
- Ancient Egypt era: XXXIII dynasty, 104
- Pharaoh: Ptolemy IV Philopator, 2
- Ancient Greek Olympiad (summer): 140th Olympiad (victor)¹
- Assyrian calendar: 4531
- Balinese saka calendar: N/A
- Bengali calendar: −813 – −812
- Berber calendar: 731
- Buddhist calendar: 325
- Burmese calendar: −857
- Byzantine calendar: 5289–5290
- Chinese calendar: 庚辰年 (Metal Dragon); 2478 or 2271 — to — 辛巳年 (Metal Snake); 2479 or 2272
- Coptic calendar: −503 – −502
- Discordian calendar: 947
- Ethiopian calendar: −227 – −226
- Hebrew calendar: 3541–3542
- Hindu calendars
- Vikram Samvat: −163 – −162
- Shaka Samvat: N/A
- Kali Yuga: 2881–2882
- Holocene calendar: 9781
- Iranian calendar: 841 BP – 840 BP
- Islamic calendar: 867 BH – 866 BH
- Javanese calendar: N/A
- Julian calendar: N/A
- Korean calendar: 2114
- Minguo calendar: 2131 before ROC 民前2131年
- Nanakshahi calendar: −1687
- Seleucid era: 92/93 AG
- Thai solar calendar: 323–324
- Tibetan calendar: ལྕགས་ཕོ་འབྲུག་ལོ་ (male Iron-Dragon) −93 or −474 or −1246 — to — ལྕགས་མོ་སྦྲུལ་ལོ་ (female Iron-Snake) −92 or −473 or −1245

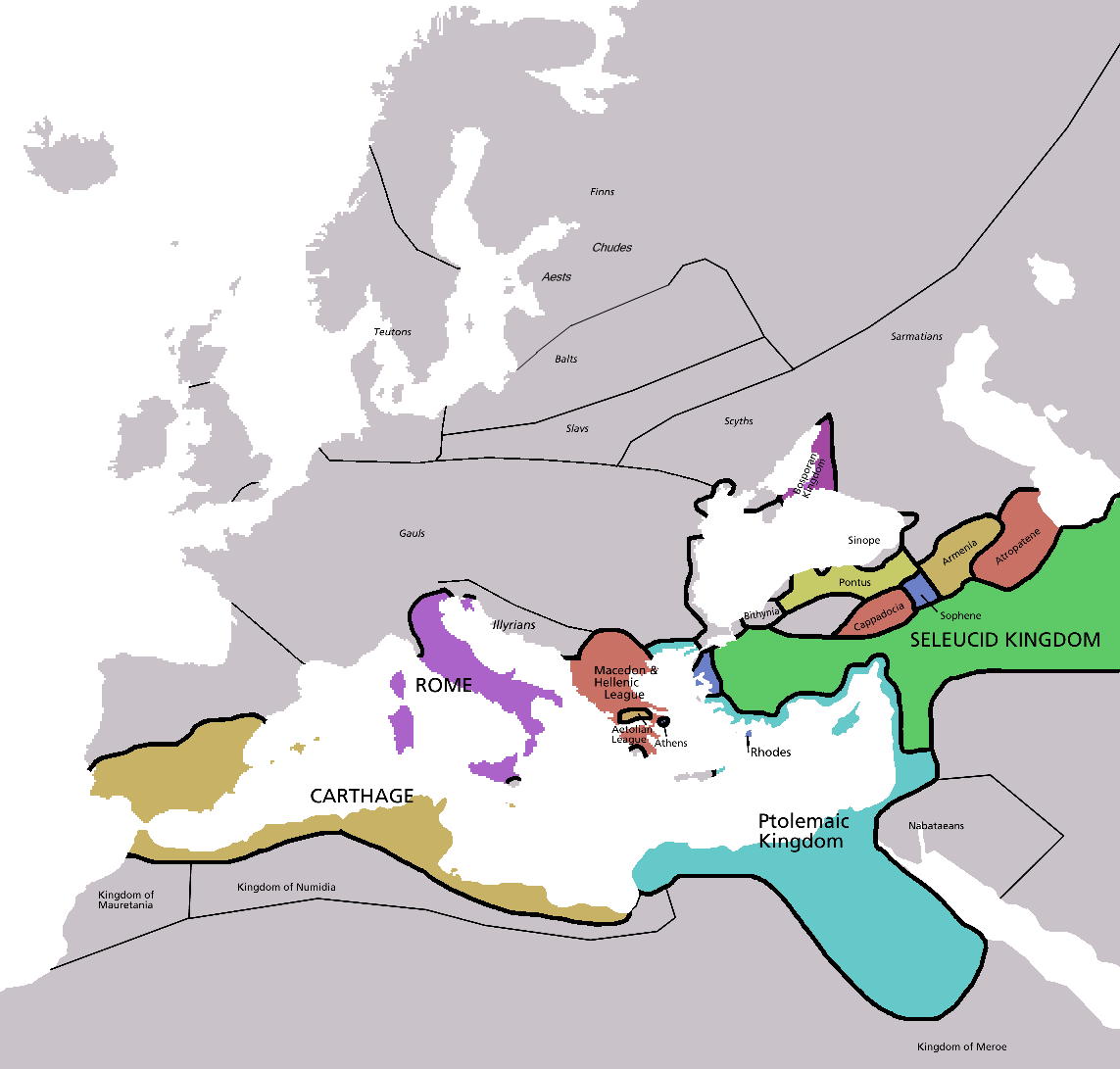
220 BC.

Year 220 BC was a year of the pre-Julian Roman calendar. At the time it was known as the Year of the Consulship of Laevinus/Catulus and Scaevola/Philo (or, less frequently, year 534 Ab urbe condita). The denomination 220 BC for this year has been used since the early medieval period, when the Anno Domini calendar era became the prevalent method in Europe for naming years.

== Events ==
=== By place ===
==== Greece ====
- Together with fellow Illyrian, Scerdilaidas, Demetrius of Pharos attacks Illyrian cities under Roman protection and leads a piratical squadron into Greek waters. They unsuccessfully attack Pylos, an Achaean town on the Messenian coast, in the Peloponnesus of Greece.
- Scerdilaidas and the Aetolians invade Achaea. With the help of Cynaethan traitors, they attack, seize and burn Cynaetha, a town in the north of Arcadia.
- Rome strikes again against the Illyrian pirates precipitating the Second Illyrian War.
- Demetrius seeks refuge with Philip V of Macedon, who is very resentful of the Roman interference. Rome occupies Demetrius' chief fortresses, Pharos and Dimillos.
- Aratus of Sicyon counters Aetolian aggression by obtaining the assistance of the Hellenic League now under the leadership of Philip V of Macedon. In the resulting Social War, the Hellenic League of Greek states is assembled in Corinth at Philip V's instigation. He then leads the Hellenic League in battles against Aetolia, Sparta and Elis.
- The Gortynians occupy Matala, on the island of Crete.

==== Seleucid Empire ====
- Antiochus III the Great defeats Molon at the Tigris River, defeating and killing. Antiochus goes on to conquer Atropatene.
- Meanwhile, the birth of a son to Antiochus III and Laodice (daughter of Mithridates II, king of Pontus) leads Hermeias to consider getting rid of the king so that he can rule under the name of the infant son. Antiochus discovers the scheme and arranges the assassination of Hermeias.

==== Anatolia ====
- Antiochus III's commander in Anatolia, Achaeus, having recovered all the districts which Attalus of Pergamum has gained, is accused by Hermeias, the chief minister of Antiochus, of intending to revolt. In self-defence, Achaeus assumes the title of king and rules over the Anatolian parts of the Seleucid kingdom.

==== Egypt ====
- Arsinoe III marries her brother, King Ptolemy IV of Egypt.

==== Roman Republic ====
- During his censorship, the Roman political leader, Gaius Flaminius, builds the Circus Flaminius on the Campus Martius and constructs the Via Flaminia from Rome to Ariminum (Rimini).

==== Iberian Peninsula ====
- Hannibal campaigns against the Vaccaei, he storms the Vaccaen strongholds of Helmantice and Arbucala.
- On his return home, laden with many spoils, a coalition of Hispanic tribes, led by the Carpetani, attack his army at the river Tagus, here Hannibal wins his first independent victory.

==== China ====
- Qin Shi Huang begins a system of tree-lined roads to interconnect all parts of China, and begins to join regional walls to form the beginnings of the Great Wall (Wan li chang cheng).
- Around this time, Prime Minister Li Si publishes Cangjiepian, a primer on the new orthographic standard for all of China, the Small Seal Script.

=== By topic ===
==== Art ====
- A bronze statue called Gallic Chieftain killing his wife and himself is made (approximate date). A Roman copy after the original statue is today preserved at Museo Nazionale Romano in Rome.
- A bronze statue called Dying Gallic trumpeter is made (possibly by Epigonus) (230-220 BC). A marble Roman copy after the original statue is today preserved at Museo Capitolino in Rome.

== Births ==
- Attalus II Philadelphus, king of Pergamon (d. 138 BC)
- Pacuvius, Roman tragic poet and writer (d. c. 130 BC)
- Tiberius Gracchus the Elder, father of the Roman political reformer Tiberius Gracchus (approximate date) (d. 154 BC)

== Deaths ==
- Conon of Samos, Greek mathematician and astronomer whose work on conic sections (curves of the intersections of a right circular cone with a plane) serves as the basis for the fourth book of the Conics of Apollonius of Perga (b. c. 280 BC)
- Molon, general of the Seleucid king Antiochus III who has rebelled against his rule
- Hermeias, the favourite and chief minister of the Seleucid king Seleucus III and, for a short time, chief minister to Antiochus III
