= Theodotus Hemiolius =

Theodotus Hemiolius (in Greek Θεoδoτoς Hμιoλιoς) was a general in the service of king Antiochus III the Great (223–187 BC), who was sent by the king in 222 BC, together with Xenon, against Molon, satrap of Media, who had raised the standard of revolt in the eastern provinces of the Seleucid Empire. However, the two generals were unable to control the rebel satrap and withdrew within the walls of the cities, leaving him in possession of the open country.

After the later and final defeat of Molon by Antiochus, Theodotus was selected by that monarch to take the command in Coele-Syria, while Antiochus undertook to reduce Seleucia on the Tigris. What Theodotus accomplished is not known, but the next year (219 BC) he was serving under the immediate command of Antiochus and bearing an important share in the action against Nicolaus, one of the generals of Ptolemy IV Philopator (221–204 BC), near Porphyreon, as well as shortly after at the siege of Rabbatamana. On both these occasions he was associated with Nicarchus, with whom he also shared command of the phalanx during the Battle of Raphia, 217 BC. After that major defeat he was chosen by Antiochus as one of the ambassadors whom he sent to Ptolemy to sue for peace.
