= Ardys =

Ardys or Ardysus may refer to:

- Ardys of Lydia, second Mermnad king of Lydia who reigned 644–637 BC
- Ardys (general) (fl. 220–219 BC), commander under Antiochus the Great
- Radio Disney Music Awards, named ARDYs (A Radio Disney Music Celebration) from 2019 to 2020
