= Zeuxis (general) =

Zeuxis (/ˈzjuːksɪs/; Ancient Greek: Zεῦξις Κυνάγου Μακεδών; Ancient Greek pronunciation: [zdêuksis]) was a general and official in the service of the Seleucid king Antiochus III the Great at the end of the 3rd century BC. He led the royal forces in Mesopotamia against the rebel Molon, served as the governor of cis-Tauric Asia Minor from 213 BC onwards, and was a general at the Battle of Magnesia. After that defeat he went to Rome to negotiate a peace.

== Career ==
Zeuxis, son of Kynagos, was engaged in 221 BC in the war with Molon, satrap of Media, whom he prevented from crossing the Tigris. He was subsequently left in charge of the camp while his commander Xenoetas engaged with Molon. Following Xenoetas's catastrophic defeat, Zeuxis retreated on the approach of Molon, who was now able to cross the Tigris unopposed. When Antiochus himself marched against Molon, Zeuxis advised him to cross the Tigris in opposition to Hermeias's proposal that the army march down the near side of the river - according to Polybius, despite his fear of Hermeias's power. He was in command of the left wing in the battle that ensued. He also took a prominent part in the siege of Seleucia on the Tigris.

It is this same Zeuxis whom we find satrap of Lydia under Antiochus the Great. In the winter of 201-200 BC, Philip V of Macedon, when at war with Attalus, applied to Zeuxis for wheat provisions, which he supplied.. He is well attested by inscriptions in his capacity as vice-roy of Asia Minor.

In the decisive Battle of Magnesia with the Romans in 190 BC, Zeuxis was one of the commanders of the center, and after the defeat of Antiochus III, he was one of the ambassadors sent to Scipio Asiaticus and Scipio Africanus to sue for peace, on which mission he proceeded to Rome. However, by then, the Seleucid position in Anatolia had been so undermined by the campaign of Gnaeus Vulso that Zeuxis and his fellow ambassador, Antipatros, had little choice but to accept the border on the Taurus.
