= Hermeias =

3rd century BC Greek, adviser to Seleucus III, chief adviser to Antiochus III

Hermeias (/hɜːrˈmaɪəs/) or Hermias (/ˈhɜːrmiəs/; Greek: Ἑρμείας or Ἑρμίας; died 220 BC) was a Carian by birth, who had raised himself to be the favourite and chief minister of Seleucus III Ceraunus (225–223 BC), and was left at the head of affairs in Syria by that monarch when he set out on the expedition across the Taurus Mountains, in the course of which Seleucus met with his death, 223 BC.

== Minister of Antiochus III ==
Seleucus's death placed Hermeias in the possession of almost undisputed power, the young king, Antiochus III (223–187 BC), being then only in his 15th year; and his jealous and grasping disposition led him to remove as far as possible all competitors for power. The formidable revolt of Molon and Alexander in the eastern provinces of the kingdom seemed to demand all the attention of Antiochus, but Hermeias persuaded him to entrust the conduct of the army sent against the insurgents to his generals, Xenon and Theodotus, while he advanced in person to attack Coele-Syria. Here, however, the king met with a complete repulse, while the army sent against Molon was totally defeated by that general, who made himself master in consequence of several of the provinces bordering the Tigris. The opinion of Hermeias, who still opposed the march of Antiochus to the East, was now overruled, and the king took the field in person the following spring. But though the favourite had succeeded in removing his chief opponent, Epigenes, by a fabricated charge of conspiracy, his utter incapacity for military affairs was fully apparent in the ensuing campaign, in which, nevertheless, Antiochus, having followed the advice of Zeuxis, in opposition to that of Hermeias, defeated Molon in a pitched battle and recovered the revolted provinces. However, during the subsequent halt at Seleucia on the Tigris, Hermeias had again an opportunity to display his evil disposition with the cruelties with which, notwithstanding the opposition of Antiochus, he stained the victory of the young king.

== Fall ==
Meanwhile, the birth of a son of Antiochus, by Laodice, is said to have excited in the mind of this ambitious minister the project of getting rid of the king himself, in order that he might rule with still more uncontrolled authority under the name of his infant son. This scheme was revealed in time to Antiochus, who had long regarded Hermeias with fear as well as aversion, and he now gladly availed himself of the assistance of his physician, Apollophanes, and others of his friends, to rid himself of his minister by assassination (220 BC). Polybius, who is the sole source for all the preceding facts, has drawn the character of Hermeias in the blackest colours, and represents his death as a subject of general rejoicing, though he considers his fate as a very inadequate punishment for his misdeeds.
