= Battle of Mount Labus =

209 BC battle

- Part of Seleucid-Parthian Wars
Date	209 BC
Location	Mount Labus
Result	Seleucid victory

Belligerents
Seleucid Empire	Parthia

Commanders and leaders
Antiochus the Great; Diogenes; Nicomedes; Nicolaus of Aetolia; Polyxenidas	Arsaces II

Strength
Unknown	Unknown, smaller than Seleucids

Casualties and losses
Unknown	Unknown

The Battle of Mount Labus was fought in 209 BCE between the Seleucid Empire under Antiochus III and the Parthians of Arsaces II. The battle ended in a Seleucid victory and the Parthians becoming Seleucid vassals.

== Background ==
Parthia had been Seleucid territory until 245 BC, when, following the death of Antiochus II and the subsequent seizure of the Seleucid capital Antioch by the Egyptians, the governor Andragoras had taken the opportunity to declare his independence. He was soon overthrown by the Parni tribe, led by Arsaces I, who then claimed the kingship of Parthia. The Parni would rule Parthia unopposed for 3 decades.

== Prelude ==
Having ended hostilities with Egypt, the Seleucid monarch Antiochus the Great sought to regain his empire's lost eastern territories. In early 209 BC he entered Media and crossed a stretch of waterless desert (most likely the Sirjan salt desert) to reach the Parthian capital Hecatompylos. Before the crossing the Parthian king Arsaces II had sent men to destroy the main wells along the route, but they were met and dispersed by 1000 Seleucid horsemen led by the commander Nicomedes. Antiochus seized Hecatompylos and made a brief stay, then set off in pursuit of Arsaces' much smaller Parthian army, which had retreated to find a more advantageous battle site. They travelled as far as the Alborz mountains in the neighbouring region of Hyrcania, which were navigable only by narrow passes. The Parthians chose the primary pass, over Mt Labus, for their confrontation with Antiochus.

== Battle ==
Knowing that he could not force the pass, Antiochus split his army into many companies which took different, smaller routes over the mountains. In front was a detachment of Cretan shields led by Polyxenidas of Rhodes and many skirmishers led by a man only known as Diogenes. The rear was brought up mainly by infantry led by Nicolaus of Aetolia and the aforementioned Nicomedes. The Parthians constructed blockades and positioned groups of soldiers on the different high points in the pass, and adverse weather caused additional trees and rocks to fall and block the Seleucids' way. An army entirely in phalanx formation could not have broken through, but the Parthians had not prepared for the light skirmishers led by Diogenes. At each blockade Diogenes' company drove off the enemy with attacks from higher ground, allowing the Seleucids to move steadily up the mountain for seven days. On the eighth day the Parthians decided to abandon their ambush tactics and fight Antiochus in a body on the summit. The contest between the infantry forces was surprisingly close, with Diogenes again making a decisive contribution; he found an alternate route to the summit and panicked Arsaces' soldiers by appearing behind them. The Parthians were routed, allowing the Seleucids to enter Hyrcania.

== Aftermath ==
Antiochus first took Tambrax, a large unwalled city. Most of its inhabitants fled to the walled Sirynx, which the Seleucids captured after a hard-fought siege. After the fall of Sirynx Arsaces opened negotiations with Antiochus, reducing Parthia to a vassal of the Seleucid Empire. Two decades later the Seleucids were defeated by the Roman Republic at the Battle of Magnesia and began a century-long decline, allowing the Parthians to regain their independence and become a dominant power in the Middle East.
