= Nicarchus (general) =

Nicarchus or Nicarch (Greek: Nίκαρχoς) was one of the generals of the Seleucid king Antiochus III the Great (223–187 BC). He served in Coele-Syria in the war between Antiochus and Ptolemy Philopator (221–203 BC). Together with Theodotus he superintended the siege of Rabbatamana, and with the same general headed the phalanx at the battle of Raphia in 217 BC.
