= Xenon (general) =

General officer (223–187 BC)

Xenon (Ancient Greek: Ξένων) was an officer in the service of Antiochus III the Great (223–187 BC), who was sent, together with Theodotus Hemiolius, against Molon in 221 BC. They retired before Molon under the shelter of the towns.
