= Seleucia Pieria =

Hellenistic city, modern Samandağ, Turkey

Seleucia in Pieria
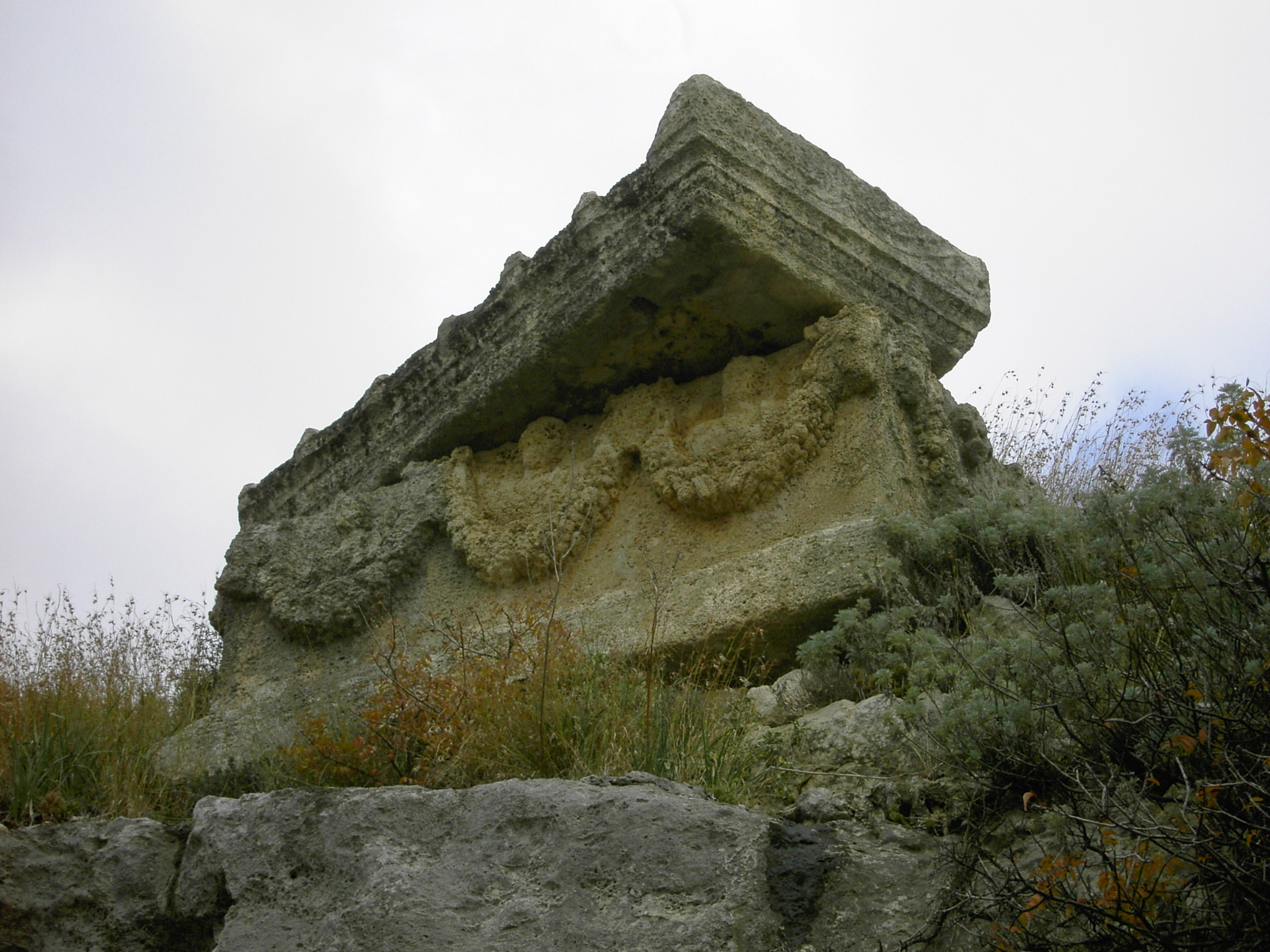
- A Roman sarcophagus on the upper hills of the city

- Location within Turkey
- 36°07′26″N 35°55′19″E
- Type: Settlement
- Periods: Hellenistic to Medieval
- Cultures: Greek, Roman, Arab, Turkish
- Location: Hatay Province, Turkey
- Region: Levant

History
- Built: 300 BC
- Built by: Seleucus I Nicator

Site notes
- Condition: In ruins

Seleucia in Pieria (Greek Σελεύκεια ἐν Πιερίᾳ), also known in English as Seleucia by the Sea, and later named Suedia, was a Hellenistic town, the seaport of Antioch ad Orontes (Syria Prima), the Seleucid capital, modern Antakya (Turkey). The city was built slightly to the north of the estuary of the river Orontes, between small rivers on the western slopes of the Coryphaeus, one of the southern summits of the Amanus Mountains.

According to Pausanias and Malalas, there was a previous city here named Palaeopolis ("Old City"). At present, it is located at the seaside village of Çevlik near the town of Samandağ in the Hatay Province of Turkey. Seleucia, Apamea, Laodicea, and Antioch formed the Syrian tetrapolis.

== History ==
=== Seleucid period ===
Seleucia Pieria was founded in ca. 300 BC by Seleucus I Nicator, one of the successors of the Macedonian conqueror Alexander the Great and the founder of the Seleucid Empire. The Macedonians called the landscape Pieria, after a district in their homeland that was also between the sea and a mountain range (the Olympus).

When Seleucus I was murdered on his way to Macedon in 281 BC, his son, Antiochus I, buried his ashes in a building called "Nikatoreion", situated in Seleucia.

The city was of great importance in the struggle between the Seleucids and the Ptolemies; it was captured by Ptolemy Euergetes in 246 BC. As the Ptolemies (Lagids) and Seleucids fought over the city, it changed hands several times, until 219 BC, when the Seleucid Antiochus III the Great recaptured it during the Fourth Syrian War (219–217 BC); his general Ardys is recorded as having distinguished himself during the siege. Then it obtained its freedom and kept it even to the end of the Roman occupation. It had long enjoyed the right of coinage.

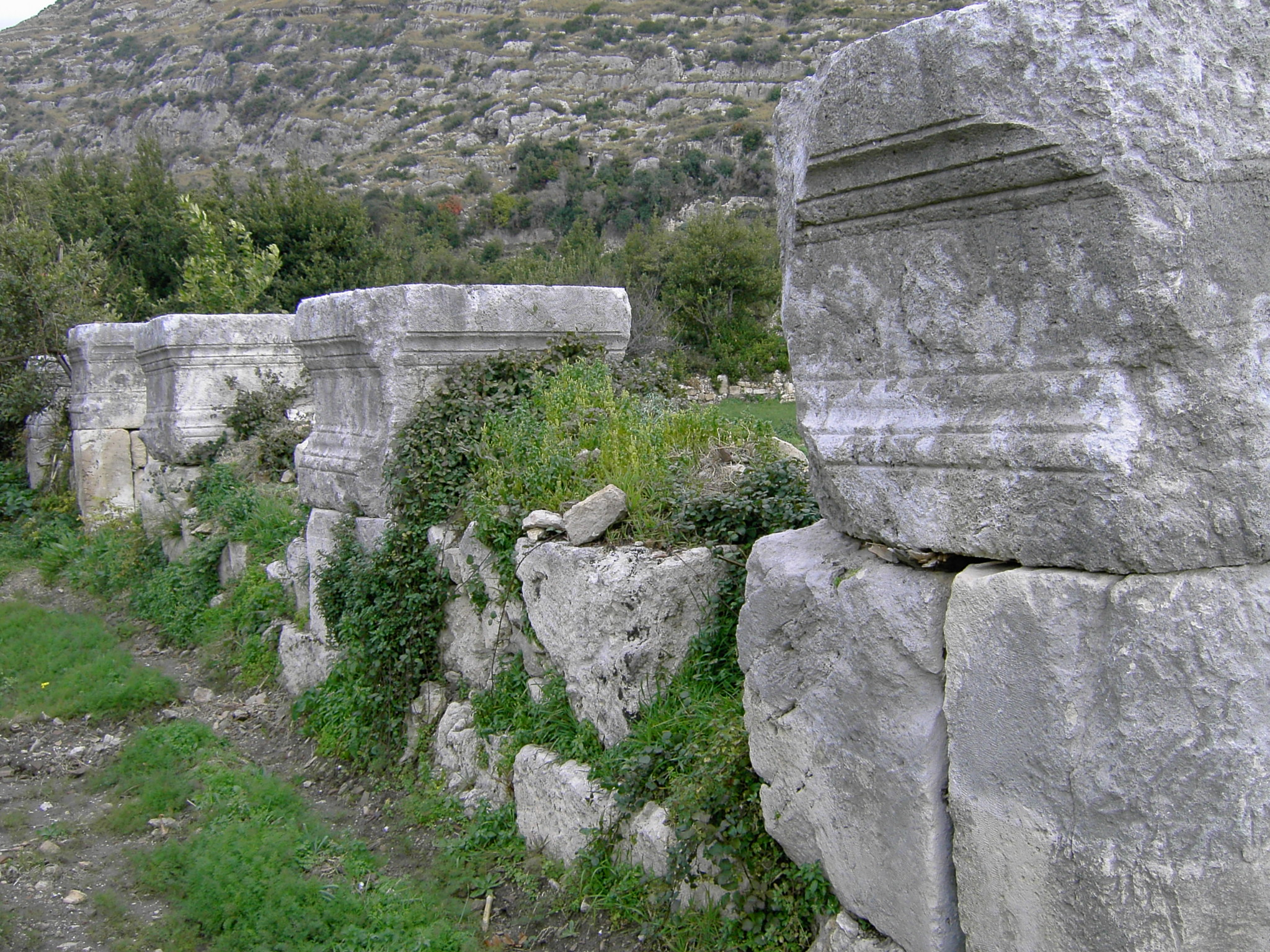
Column plinths of possibly the main/harbour street

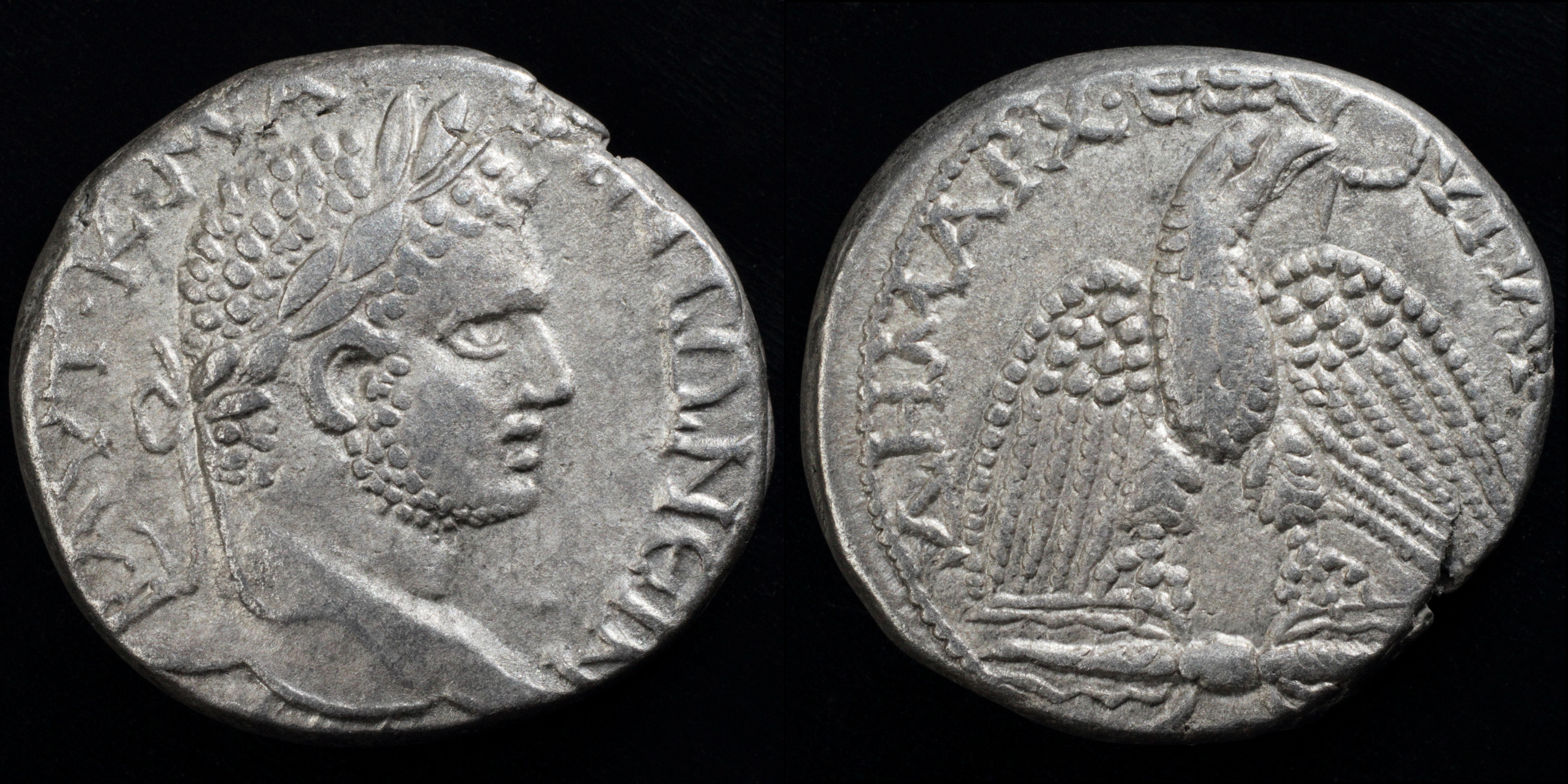
silver tetradrachm struck in Seleucia by Caracalla 215–217 AD

=== Roman period ===
Seleucia's importance grew significantly over time, necessitating the enlargement of its harbours several times under Diocletian and Constantius. These harbours, called the "inner" and "outer" harbours, served from time to time the Roman navy.

Most buildings and structures today date from the Roman period.

=== Byzantine period ===
During Byzantine times the city went into a steady decline. The silting up of the city's harbours hastened this process. In the fifth century CE the fight to keep them open was finally given up. It suffered severely in the devastating 526 Antioch earthquake.

=== Islamic period ===
Seleucia was captured by the Sassanids around 540 CE. While it never recovered as a port-city again, Al-Walid ibn Abd al-Malik, Umayyad Caliph from 705 to 715, built a fortress in the city.

== Seleucia Pieria and Christianity ==
The city was Christianized early. As the port of Antioch of Syria, "Seleucia on sea"—so called to distinguish it from other cities of the same name—is most notable as the precise point of embarkation from which the Apostle Paul [in 45 CE] and Saint Barnabas sailed from, on their first missionary journeys, as chronicled in the Bible (Acts 13:4). At the end of that same journey Paul must have made landfall at Seleucia before going to Antioch (see Acts 14:26). His route at the beginning of the second journey was by land and probably bypassed Seleucia (see Acts 15:40–41), though on returning, he must have passed through it again (see Acts 18:22). Once more taking a land route when setting out on his third journey, Paul may have missed Seleucia (see Acts 19:1), and at that journey's end he did not return to Antioch and so missed Seleucia again (see Acts 21:7–8). This means that Paul passed through Seleucia at least three times, and probably several more on pre-missionary visits to Antioch of Syria (see Acts 11:26; 12:25).

The oldest bishop known is Zenobius, present at the Council of Nicaea in 325 CE. Other known bishops include Eusebius, an Arian, and Bizus in the fourth century, with twelve others cited by Le Quien (Oriens Christianus, II, 777–780). In the sixth century CE the Notitia Episcopatuum of Antioch, gives Seleucia Pieria as an autocephalous archbishopric, suffragan of Antioch (Échos d'Orient, X 144); the diocese existed until the tenth century CE, and its boundaries are known (Échos d'Orient, X, 97). For some Roman Catholic titularies see Eubel, Hierarchia catholica medii aevi, I, 468.

Seleucia Pieria was a diocese of the Greek Orthodox Patriarchate of Antioch, the Syriac (Miaphysitic) Orthodox Church appointed bishops to the city in the eighth and ninth centuries CE, three of whose bishops are known. The last-known Syriac Orthodox bishop of Seleucia, Ahron (847/874 CE), is mentioned in the lists of Michael the Syrian. There were also Georgian monastic establishments around Seleucia from the 11th to the 13th centuries.

The city is still a titular see of the Roman Catholic Church, Seleuciensis Pierius; the seat is vacant following the death of the last bishop in 1980.

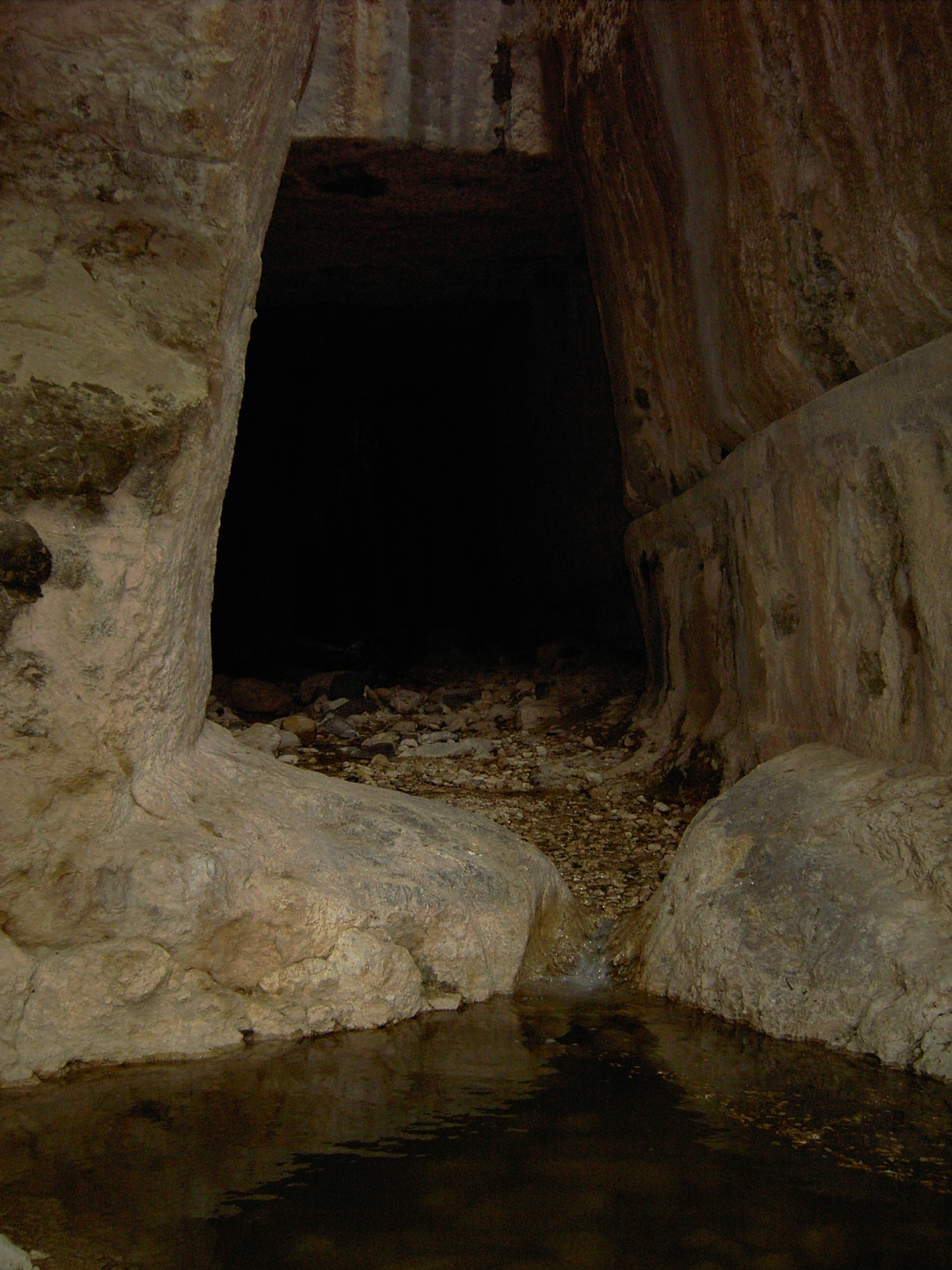
A section of the Titus Tunnel

=== Known bishops ===
- Eugenius of Seleucia heretical follower of Athanasius, grandson of Empress Theodora
- Dositheus I
- Zenobius, present at the Council of Nicaea in 325 CE.
- Eusebius 350
- Bizus fl 381
- Maximus
- Vasilius of Seleucia, Attendee of Council of Ephesus in 431, supporter of Nestorius.
- Basil of Seleucia fl 452.
- Dositheus II fl 553.
- Gerontius fl 448.
- Nonus of Seleucia; from about 505 AD, exiled about 521 for heresy.
- Constantius, a heretic
- Dyonisis fl 553
- Antonius,
- Theodorus
- Agapoius
- Nicholas
- Ahron (847–874 CE).

=== Latin titular archbishop ===
- Jules Georges Kandela (1959–1980)
- Cardinal Fernando Cento (1926–1959)
- Paul-Eugène Roy (1914–1925)
- Domenico Serafini, (1912–1914)
- Tommaso Maria Granello (1897–1911)

== Main sites ==
The upper city, about 13 km in circumference, is still distinguishable. The lower city, smaller than the preceding one, was more thickly populated. Ruins include a necropolis, amphitheatre, citadel, temples, some irrigation works as well as some fortifications.

The highlight of the city is a 1350–1400m-long tunnel/canal complex built during Roman times. It is believed that it was dug to divert the nearby river and prevent the harbour from silting up with time. A further reason is assumed to be to help reduce flooding caused during heavy winter rains. Construction began during the reign of Emperor Vespasian (69–79 CE) continuing mainly during his son Titus's time (79–81 CE).

According to Flavius Josephus, a Roman-Jewish historian (37–ca.100 CE), Jewish slaves were used as workers. These were working under orders of Emperor Titus, who had captured Jerusalem in 70 CE. Other POWs were sent to Rome, where they had to build the Colosseum. According to an inscription, the tunnel/canal was not completely finished until the reign of Antoninus Pius (138–161 CE). The last workers were Roman legionaries.

Most parts of the tunnel/canal are intact and it can be visited on foot. Rock tombs are found on the wall of the canal.

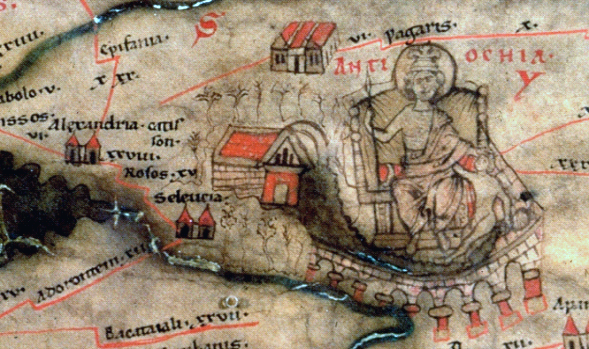
The Peutinger Map showing Syrian Antioch Alexandria and Seleucia in the 4th century

== Notable persons ==
Famous residents include Apollophanes, a physician of Antiochus III the Great (third century), and Firmus who aroused Palmyra and Egypt against Rome in 272.

== See also ==
- List of ancient Greek cities
