= 209 BC =

209 BC in various calendars
Gregorian calendar	209 BC; CCIX BC
Ab urbe condita	545
Ancient Egypt era	XXXIII dynasty, 115
Pharaoh	Ptolemy IV Philopator, 13
Ancient Greek Olympiad (summer)	142nd Olympiad, year 4
Assyrian calendar	4542
Balinese saka calendar	N/A
Bengali calendar	−802 – −801
Berber calendar	742
Buddhist calendar	336
Burmese calendar	−846
Byzantine calendar	5300–5301
Chinese calendar	辛卯年 (Metal Rabbit); 2489 or 2282 — to — 壬辰年 (Water Dragon); 2490 or 2283
Coptic calendar	−492 – −491
Discordian calendar	958
Ethiopian calendar	−216 – −215
Hebrew calendar	3552–3553
- Hindu calendars
Vikram Samvat	−152 – −151
Shaka Samvat	N/A
Kali Yuga	2892–2893
Holocene calendar	9792
Iranian calendar	830 BP – 829 BP
Islamic calendar	856 BH – 854 BH
Javanese calendar	N/A
Julian calendar	N/A
Korean calendar	2125
Minguo calendar	2120 before ROC 民前2120年
Nanakshahi calendar	−1676
Seleucid era	103/104 AG
Thai solar calendar	334–335
Tibetan calendar	ལྕགས་མོ་ཡོས་ལོ་ (female Iron-Hare) −82 or −463 or −1235 — to — ཆུ་ཕོ་འབྲུག་ལོ་ (male Water-Dragon) −81 or −462 or −1234

Year 209 BC was a year of the pre-Julian Roman calendar. At the time it was known as the Year of the Consulship of Verrucosus and Flaccus (or, less frequently, year 545 Ab urbe condita). The denomination 209 BC for this year has been used since the early medieval period, when the Anno Domini calendar era became the prevalent method in Europe for naming years.

== Events ==
=== By place ===
==== Roman Republic ====
- The Romans under Quintus Fabius Maximus Verrucosus capture Tarentum (modern Taranto), which the Carthaginian general Hannibal has held for three years.
- The Battle of Canusium is fought between Hannibal's Carthaginian army and a Roman force led by Marcus Claudius Marcellus. The battle is indecisive.
- From his headquarters at Tarraco (Tarragona), Publius Cornelius Scipio, the Roman commander in Spain, launches a combined military and naval assault on the Carthaginian headquarters at Carthago Nova (modern-day Cartagena). He successfully besieges and captures the city. In capturing this city, Scipio gains access to copious stores and supplies, Spanish hostages, the local silver mines, a splendid harbour and a base for an advance further south.

==== Seleucid Empire ====
- The King of the Parthians, Arsaces II, is attacked by the Seleucid king Antiochus III, who takes Hecatompylos (southeast of the Caspian Sea), the Arsacid capital and Syrinx in Hyrcania. Antiochus III defeats Arsaces II at the Battle of Mount Labus and then forces Arsaces II to enter into an alliance with the Seleucids.

==== Greece ====
- As strategos of the Achaeans, the Greek general Philopoemen is responsible for turning the Achaean League into an aggressive military power. He builds up the League's military capability. The Achaean League's army and cavalry under Philopoemen then defeat the Aetolians on the Elean frontier.

==== China ====
- Jiao, Lord of Wey is deposed by Emperor Qin Er Shi, marking the end of the state of Wei
- In August, Chen Sheng and Wu Guang begin an uprising to oppose Qin
- The rebels restore the monarchies of Chu, Qi, Yan, Zhao, Wei and (in 208) Han.
- The Qin general Zhang Han defeats an invasion of Guanzhong by the rebel general Zhou Wen.
- Wu Guang is killed by his own officers, and Zhang Han defeats Chen Sheng, who is killed by an attendant while in flight.
- Having helped to conquer Baiyue in northern Vietnam and southern China for the Qin dynasty, the general Zhao Tuo uses the rebellions against the Qin to establish his own independent kingdom in Nanyue, and conquers the neighboring provinces of Guilin and Xiang. He declares himself King Wu of Nanyue.

==== Central Asia ====
- Modun khaan inherits Teoman's Hunnu confederations and founds the Xiongnu Empire in Mongolia proper. Modu's forces push into Northern China, threatening the Qin Empire and forcing them to further fortify the Great Wall.

== Deaths ==
- Touman, chanyu of the Xiongnu Empire. (Killed by his successor)
