= 189 BC =

189 BC in various calendars
- Gregorian calendar: 189 BC; CLXXXIX BC
- Ab urbe condita: 565
- Ancient Egypt era: XXXIII dynasty, 135
- Pharaoh: Ptolemy V Epiphanes, 15
- Ancient Greek Olympiad (summer): 147th Olympiad, year 4
- Assyrian calendar: 4562
- Balinese saka calendar: N/A
- Bengali calendar: −782 – −781
- Berber calendar: 762
- Buddhist calendar: 356
- Burmese calendar: −826
- Byzantine calendar: 5320–5321
- Chinese calendar: 辛亥年 (Metal Pig); 2509 or 2302 — to — 壬子年 (Water Rat); 2510 or 2303
- Coptic calendar: −472 – −471
- Discordian calendar: 978
- Ethiopian calendar: −196 – −195
- Hebrew calendar: 3572–3573
- Hindu calendars
- Vikram Samvat: −132 – −131
- Shaka Samvat: N/A
- Kali Yuga: 2912–2913
- Holocene calendar: 9812
- Iranian calendar: 810 BP – 809 BP
- Islamic calendar: 835 BH – 834 BH
- Javanese calendar: N/A
- Julian calendar: N/A
- Korean calendar: 2145
- Minguo calendar: 2100 before ROC 民前2100年
- Nanakshahi calendar: −1656
- Seleucid era: 123/124 AG
- Thai solar calendar: 354–355
- Tibetan calendar: ལྕགས་མོ་ཕག་ལོ་ (female Iron-Boar) −62 or −443 or −1215 — to — ཆུ་ཕོ་བྱི་བ་ལོ་ (male Water-Rat) −61 or −442 or −1214

Year 189 BC was a year of the pre-Julian Roman calendar. At the time it was known as the Year of the Consulship of Nobilior and Vulso (or, less frequently, year 565 Ab urbe condita). The denomination 189 BC for this year has been used since the early medieval period, when the Anno Domini calendar era became the prevalent method in Europe for naming years.

== Events ==
=== By place ===
==== Roman Republic ====
- Cato the Elder criticizes the consul Marcus Fulvius Nobilior for giving awards to Roman soldiers for doing ordinary tasks, such as digging wells.

==== Greece ====
- The defeat of Antiochus III by the Romans in the Battle of Magnesia robs the Aetolian League of its principal foreign ally and makes it impossible for them to stand alone in continued opposition to Rome. The League is forced to sign a peace treaty with Rome that makes it a subject ally of the Republic. Although the League continues to exist in name, the power of the League is broken by the treaty and it never again constitutes a significant political or military force.

==== Asia Minor ====
- The Romans under consul Gnaeus Manlius Vulso, along with a Pergamene army under Eumenes II, defeat the Galatians in Anatolia and make them subjects of Pergamum.
- The city of Philadelphia (now Alaşehir, Turkey) is founded by King Eumenes II of Pergamon. Eumenes names the city after his brother, Attalus, whose loyalty earns him the nickname, "Philadelphus", literally meaning "one who loves his brother".
- The territory of Artsakh first became known for being inhabited by Armenians-notably within the city of Tigranakert, one of four cities named after Tigranes the Great in the ancient Armenian empire.

== Deaths ==
- Fan Kuai, Chinese general and politician of the Han dynasty (during the Chu-Han Contention)
- Liu Fei, Chinese prince and proclaimed king of the former Qi State (Zhou dynasty) (b. 221 BC)
- Zhang Liang, Chinese rebel and taoist, who has helped Liu Bang establish the Han dynasty (b. 262 BC)
