= 290 BC =

290 BC in various calendars
Gregorian calendar	290 BC; CCXC BC
Ab urbe condita	464
Ancient Egypt era	XXXIII dynasty, 34
Pharaoh	Ptolemy I Soter, 34
Ancient Greek Olympiad (summer)	122nd Olympiad, year 3
Assyrian calendar	4461
Balinese saka calendar	N/A
Bengali calendar	−883 – −882
Berber calendar	661
Buddhist calendar	255
Burmese calendar	−927
Byzantine calendar	5219–5220
Chinese calendar	庚午年 (Metal Horse); 2408 or 2201 — to — 辛未年 (Metal Goat); 2409 or 2202
Coptic calendar	−573 – −572
Discordian calendar	877
Ethiopian calendar	−297 – −296
Hebrew calendar	3471–3472
- Hindu calendars
Vikram Samvat	−233 – −232
Shaka Samvat	N/A
Kali Yuga	2811–2812
Holocene calendar	9711
Iranian calendar	911 BP – 910 BP
Islamic calendar	939 BH – 938 BH
Javanese calendar	N/A
Julian calendar	N/A
Korean calendar	2044
Minguo calendar	2201 before ROC 民前2201年
Nanakshahi calendar	−1757
Seleucid era	22/23 AG
Thai solar calendar	253–254
Tibetan calendar	阳金马年 (male Iron-Horse) −163 or −544 or −1316 — to — 阴金羊年 (female Iron-Goat) −162 or −543 or −1315

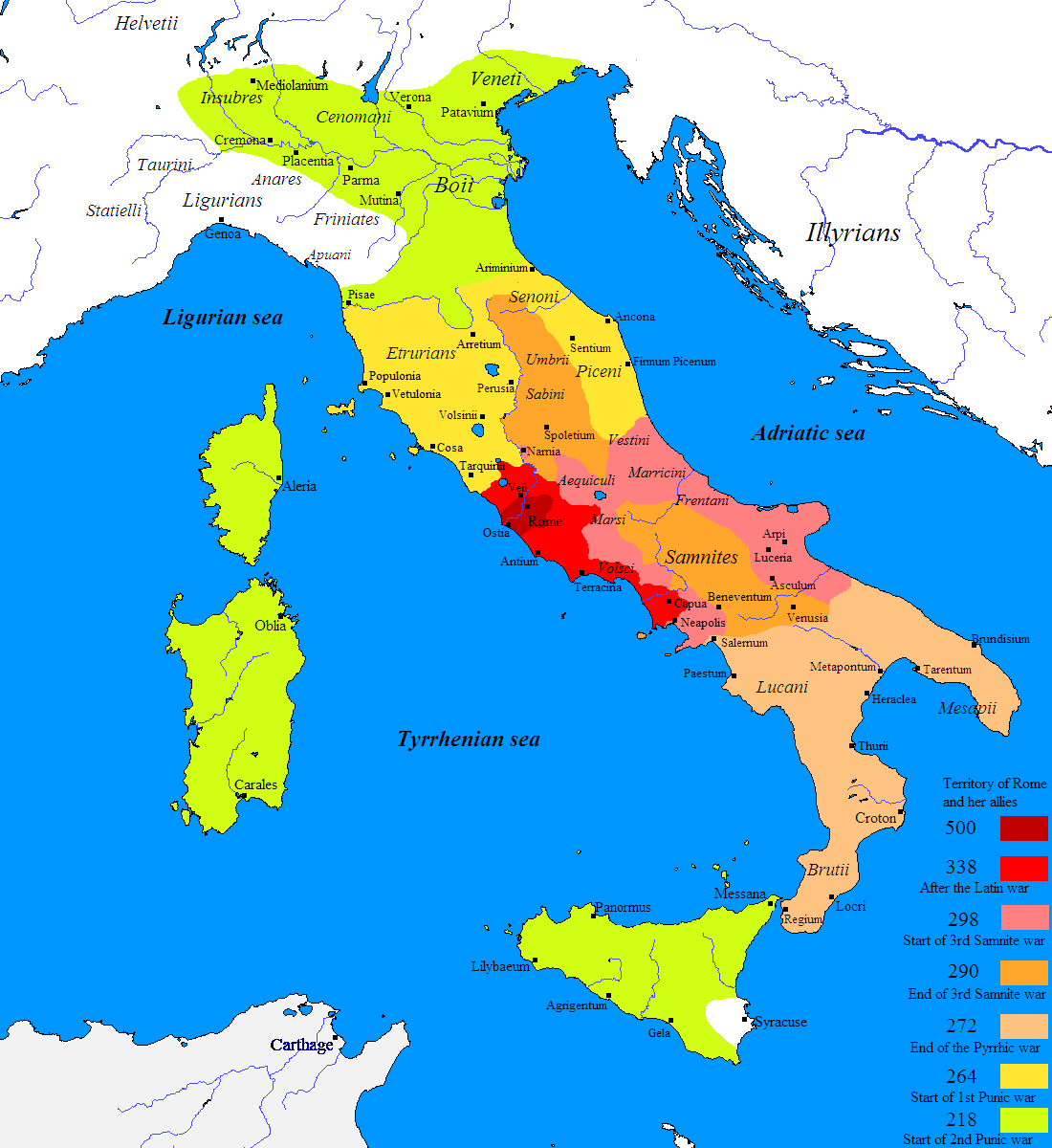
Roman expansion in Italy from 500 BC to 218 BC through the Latin War (light red), Samnite Wars (pink/orange), Pyrrhic War (beige), and First and Second Punic War (yellow and green). The Roman Republic in 290 BC is marked with dark and light red, pink and orange.

Year 290 BC was a year of the pre-Julian Roman calendar. At the time it was known as the Year of the Consulship of Rufinus and Dentatus (or, less frequently, year 464 Ab urbe condita). The denomination 290 BC for this year has been used since the early medieval period, when the Anno Domini calendar era became the prevalent method in Europe for naming years.

== Events ==
=== By place ===
==== Roman Republic ====
- Third Samnite War:

- Lucius Postumius Megellus, a consul from the previous year, is publicly tried for having used his office to have 2000 of his soldiers work on his farm. He is condemned by all the tribes and fined 50,000 denarii.
- The consuls Manius Curius Dentatus and Publius Cornelius Rufinus invade Samnium and defeat the Samnites in several engagements. The Samnites sue for peace, thus ending the Third Samnite War. The Samnites are recognised by the Romans as autonomous allies but are subordinate to Rome and must give up land as compensation.
- Curius subjugates the Sabines, possibly for their actions or inaction during the Third Samnite War. Their territory is annexed, securing direct Roman access to the Adriatic. The Sabines are granted civitas sine suffragio ("citizenship without the right to vote").
- Rome founds the colonies of Castrum, Sena and Adria.

==== Egypt ====
- Berenice, wife of Ptolemy, is proclaimed queen of Egypt. Ptolemy has the city of Berenice built on the Red Sea in her honour. It becomes a great emporium for Egyptian trade with the East.

==== China ====
- The city of Yuan is returned by the State of Qin to the State of Wei in exchange for the cities of Puban and Pishi.

== Births ==
- Lucius Caecilius Metellus, Roman consul and Pontifex Maximus (approximate date) (d. 221 BC)

== Deaths ==
- Megasthenes, Greek historian, diplomat and Indian ethnographer (approximate date) (b. c. 350 BC)
