= Lagoras =

Cretan mercenary commander

Lagoras (Greek: Λαγόρας) was a Cretan soldier of fortune, who, when in the service of Ptolemy IV Philopator, king of Egypt, was sent by Nicolaus, Ptolemy's general, to occupy the passes of Mount Lebanon at Berytus, and to check there the advance of Antiochus III the Great, who was marching upon Ptolemais, 219 BC. He was, however, defeated and dislodged from his position by the Seleucid king.

In 215 BC, in the war of Antiochus against Achaeus, we find Lagoras in the service of the former; and it was through his discovery of an unguarded part of the wall of Sardis, that Antiochus was enabled to take the city, Lagoras being himself one of the select party who forced their way into the town over the portion of the wall in question.
