= Xenoetas =

Ancient Greek soldier, Seleucid general

Xenoetas (/zɪˈniːtəs/; Ancient Greek: Ξενοίτας; killed in 221 BC) was an Achaean in the service of the Seleucid king Antiochus the Great; he was despatched by his chief minister Hermeias in command of an army against the rebel satrap of Media, Molon, in 221 BC. This unusual distinction seems greatly to have elated him. He conducted himself arrogantly towards his friends, and exhibited no small presumption and rashness in his military operations. He succeeded in crossing the Tigris, but fell into the snare laid for him by Molon, who feigned a retreat, and suddenly returning surprised Xenoetas when the greater part of his forces were sunk in drunken sleep. Xenoetas was killed, and his army cut to pieces.
