= Ardys (general) =

3rd-century BC Greek general

Ardys is known from the writings of the Greek historian Polybius. He was an experienced general who commanded the right wing of the army of Antiochus the Great in his battle against the Seleucid rebel Molon in 220 BCE. He distinguished himself in the next year in the siege of Seleucia Pieria.
