= Nicolaus of Aetolia =

Nicolaus (Greek: Nικoλαoς, Nikolaos) was an Aetolian, and a general of Ptolemy IV Philopator (221–204 BC), king of Egypt. In 219 BC he led a siege of Ptolemais, which was held by the traitor Theodotus, who had revolted from Ptolemy to Antiochus III the Great (223–187 BC). Nicolaus, however, abandoned the siege on the approach of the Seleucid king. In the same year he did much towards baffling the attempt of Antiochus on Dora in Phoenicia, by sending constant succours to the besieged. In 218 BC he was invested by Ptolemy with the supreme command in Coele-Syria, an appointment fully warranted, according to Polybius, by his military experience and bravery. He was, however, dislodged by Antiochus and his generals from a strong position which he had taken up between the range of Mount Lebanon and the sea near the town of Porphyreon, and was obliged to seek safety in a precipitate flight towards Sidon. It may be conjectured that after this he deserted to Antiochus: at least, we find the name of Nicolaus of Aetolia mentioned among the generals of the Syrian king during the Battle of Mount Labus 209 BC.
