= Salt desert of Sirjan =

Salt field in Iran

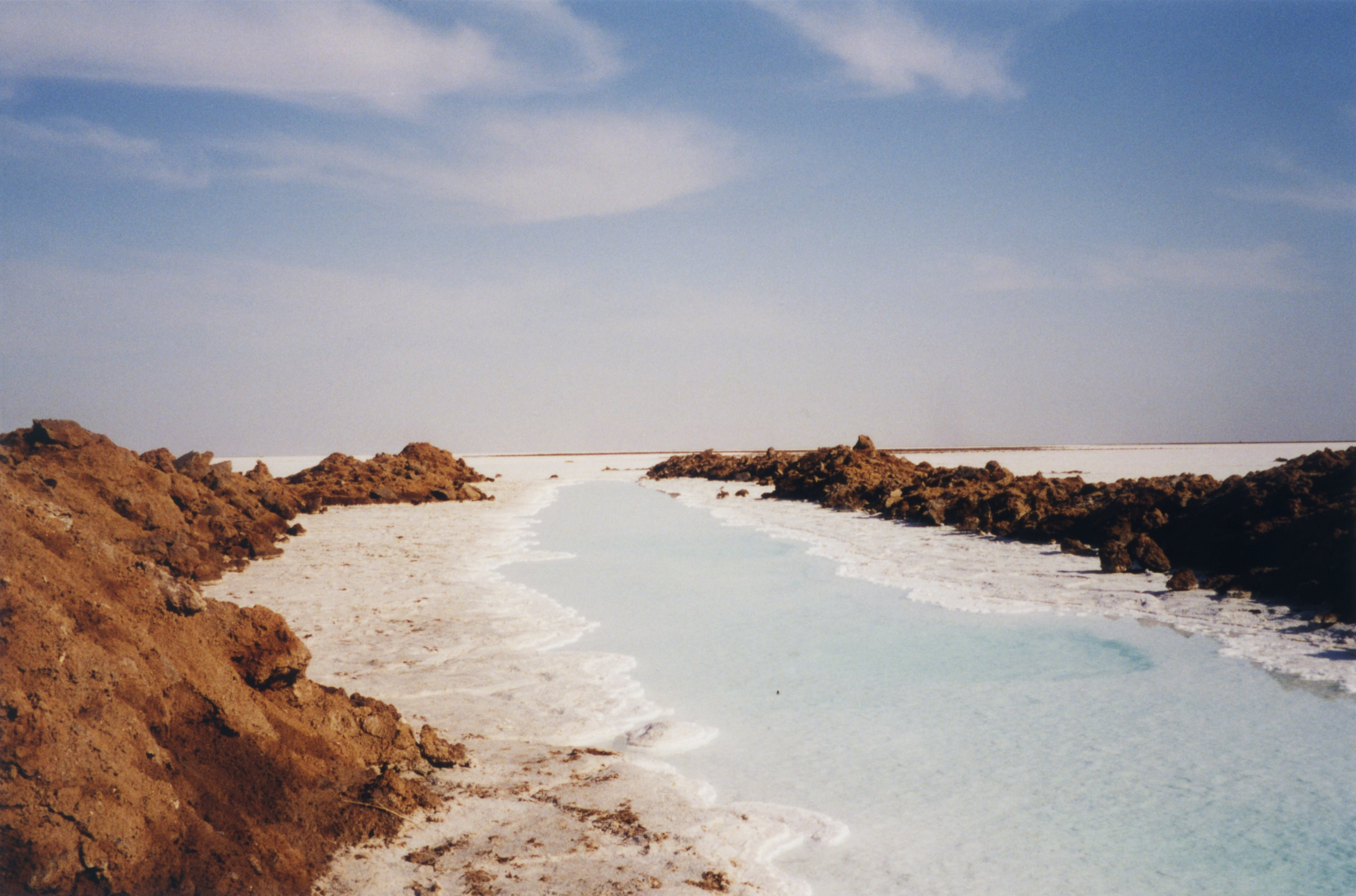

- Location within Iran
- Length: 35 km (22 mi) N-S
- Width: 10 km (6.2 mi) E-W
- Area: 350 km^{2} (140 mi^{2})

Naming
- Native name: سيرجان (Persian)

Geography
- Location: Kerman, Iran
- Country: Iran
- Population center: Sirjan
- Borders on: Road 86 (Iran) (south)
- Coordinates: 29.3295427°N 55.4674736°E
- Interactive map of Salt desert of Sirjan

Salt desert of Sirjan (Persian: کویر نمک سیرجان) is a salt field in Iran that appears after arrival of a flood tide and evaporates. It is a field of soluble salt. Occasionally, rain turns it into a salt lake. The salt desert of Sirjan is located about 27 kilometers from the Sirjan to Shiraz road near Kheirabad village.

The field covers more than 35,000 hectares. Occasionally, rain turns it into a salt lake. The salt factory established near this place uses this salt to produce edible salt. Vegetation in area is very poor because of high temperature evaporation and poor soil.

This area is polluted and damaged because of the waste and garbage of the nearby iron factory.

== Gallery ==
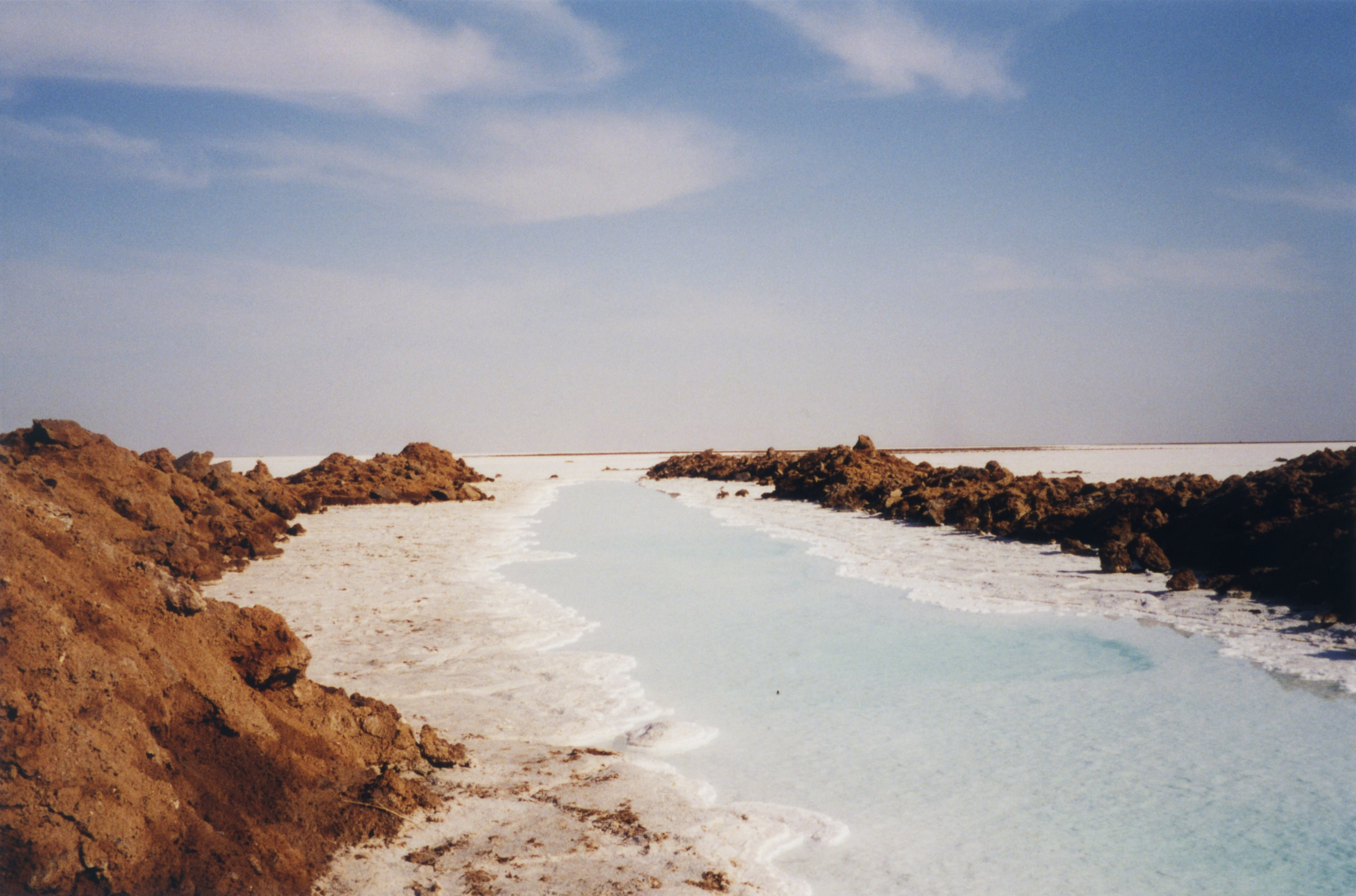

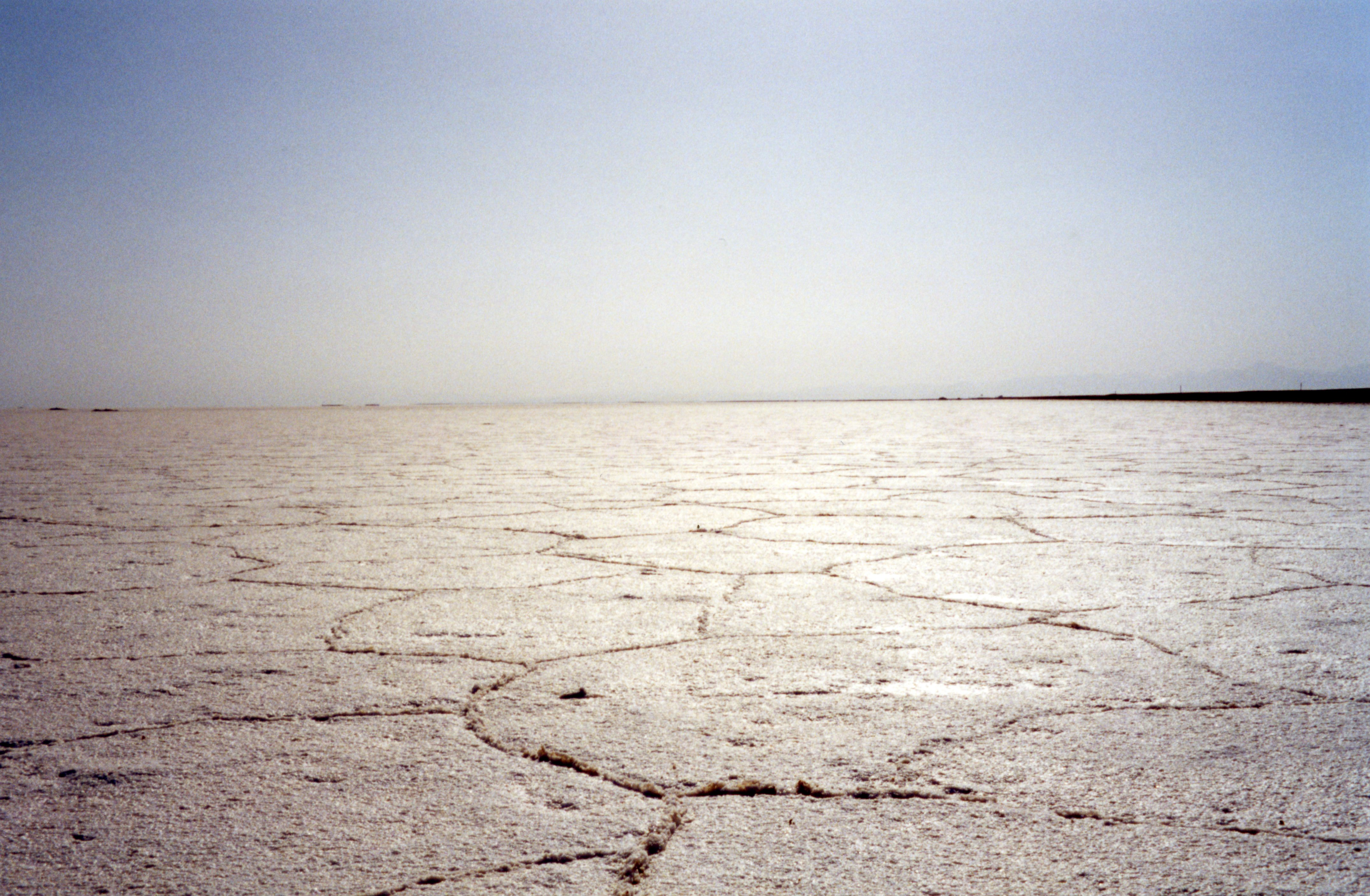

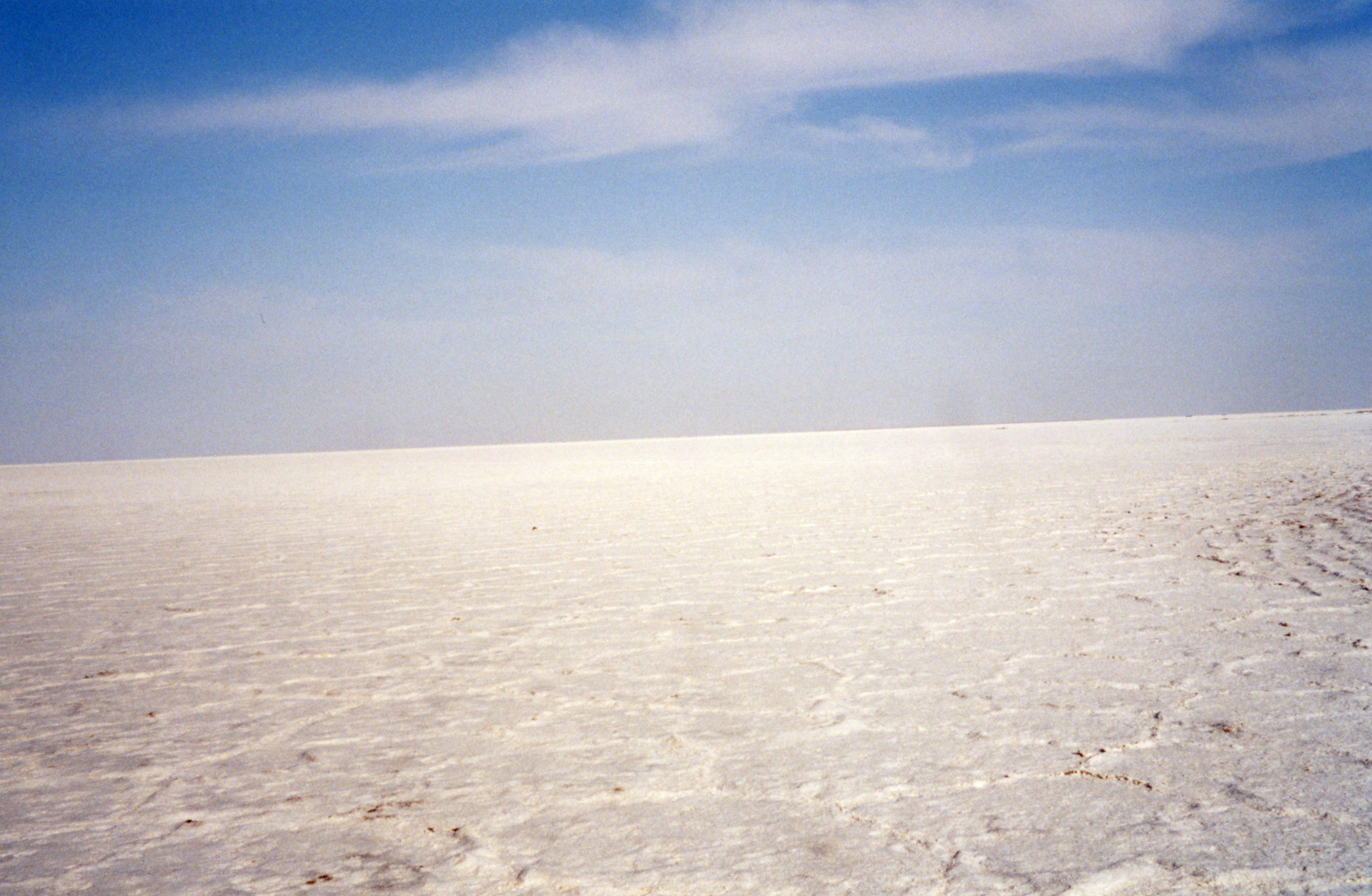
