= Apollophanes of Seleucia =

Apollophanes (Ancient Greek: Ἀπολλοφάνης) was a native of Seleucia Pieria, and physician to Antiochus the Great, king of Syria, from 223 to 187 BCE, with whom, as appears from Polybius, he possessed considerable influence.

Physician Richard Mead, in his Dissert. de Nummis quibusdam a Smyrnaeis in Medicorum Honorem percussis (Lond. 1724, 4to.), thinks that two bronze coins, struck in honor of a person named Apollophanes, refer to the physician of this name; but this is now generally considered to be a mistake. A physician of the same name is mentioned by several ancient medical writers.
