= Alexander (satrap) =

3rd-century BC Seleucid satrap

- Greek: Αλέξανδρος

Satrapy of Persis
- In office 223 BC – 220 BC

Personal details
- Died: 220 BC
- Cause of death: Suicide
- Relatives: Molon (brother)

Alexander (in Greek Αλέξανδρος; died 220 BC) was brother of Molon. On the accession of the Seleucid king Antiochus III, afterwards called the Great, in 223 BC, he entrusted Alexander with the government of the satrapy of Persis and Molon received Media. Up to that time, local rulers of Persis, the Fratarakas seem to have been in charge of the region, between circa 295 and 220 BC.

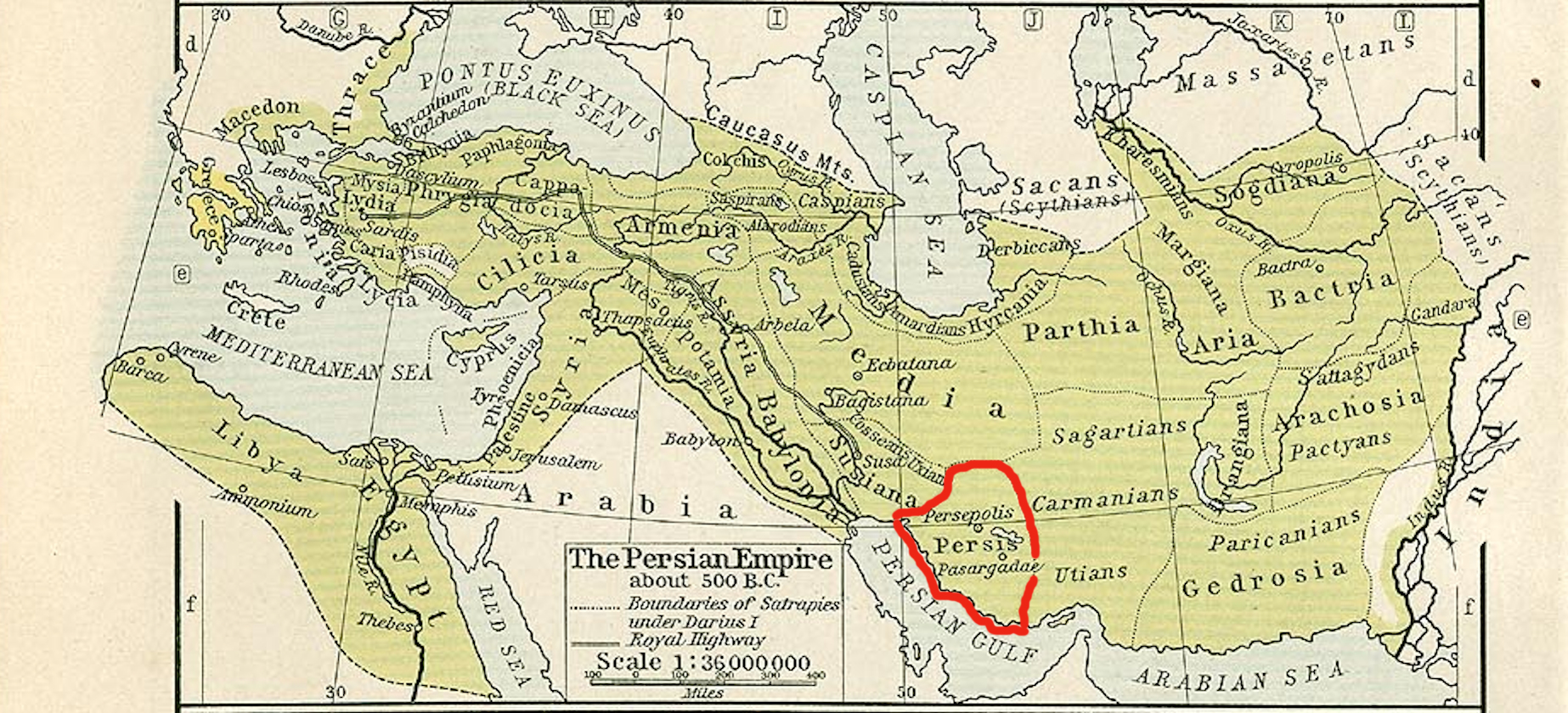
Alexander was Satrap of Persis circa 220 BC.

Antiochus was then only fifteen years of age, and this circumstance together with the fact that Hermeias, a crafty intriguer whom every one had to fear, was all-powerful at his court, induced the two brothers to form the plan of causing the upper satrapies of the kingdom to revolt. It seems to have been the secret wish of Hermeias to see the king involved as many difficulties as possible, and it was on his advice that the war against the rebels was entrusted to men without courage and ability. In 220, however, Antiochus himself undertook the command. Molon was deserted by his troops, and to avoid falling into the hands of the king, put an end to his own life. All the leaders of the rebellion followed his example, and one of them, who escaped to Persis, killed Molon's mother and children, persuaded Alexander to put an end to his life, and at last killed himself upon the bodies of his friends.

Persis soon came under the control of the Kings of Persis, who then came under the control of the Parthians.
