= Molon =

Seleucid satrap (died 220 BC)

- Basileus
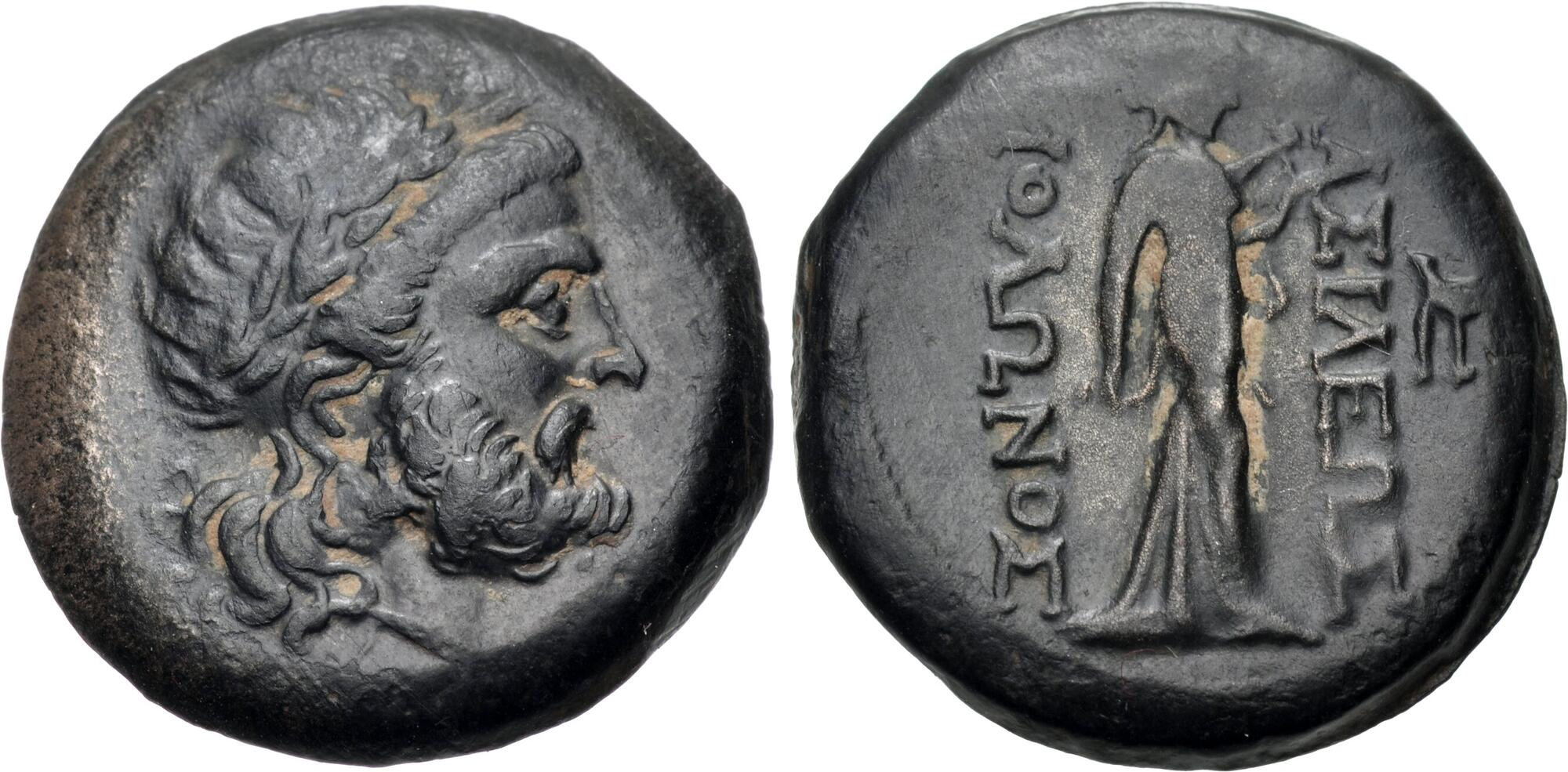
- Drachm minted during his revolt.

Usurper King of the Seleucid Empire
- Reign: 222–220 BC
- Predecessor: Antiochus III
- Successor: Antiochus III
- Died: 220 BC; Mesopotamia

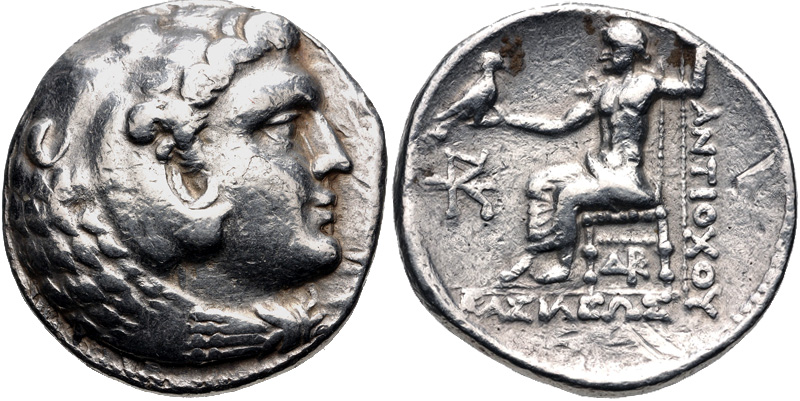
Coinage of Antiochos III, Susa mint, during his first reign at Susa (223-222 BC), before the revolt of Molon

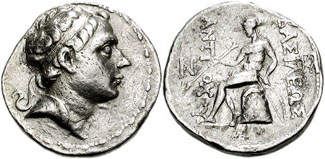
Coinage of Antiochos III, Susa mint, during his second reign at Susa (220-187 BC), after the revolt of Molon.

Molon (/ˈmoʊlən/ or /ˈmoʊˌlɒn/) or Molo (/ˈmoʊloʊ/; Ancient Greek: Mόλων; died 220 BC) was a general and satrap of the Seleucid king Antiochus the Great (223–187 BC). He held the satrapy of Media at the accession of that monarch (223 BC); in addition to which, Antiochus conferred upon him and his brother Alexander the government of all the upper provinces of his empire. But their hatred of Hermeias, the chief minister of Antiochus, soon led them both to revolt in 222 BC. The two generals at first sent against them by the king were unable to oppose their progress, and Molon found himself at the head of a large army, and master of the whole country to the east of the Tigris.

He was, however, foiled in his attempts to pass that river by Zeuxis. However, Xenoetas, the general of Antiochus, who was now sent against him with a large force, having ventured to cross it in his turn, was surprised by Molon, and his whole army cut to pieces. The rebel satrap now crossed the Tigris, and made himself master of the city of Seleucia on the Tigris together with the whole of Babylonia and Mesopotamia.

The formidable character of the insurrection now at last prompted Antiochus to march in person against the rebels. After wintering at Nisibis, he crossed the Tigris in 220 BC, and advanced southwards against Molon, who marched from Babylon to meet him. The right wing of Antiochus' army was commanded by Ardys. A pitched battle ensued, in which the desertion of the left wing of the rebel army at once decided the victory in favour of the king. Molon killed himself on the battlefield to avoid capture. His body was impaled on the slope of the Zagros Mountains at the urging of Hermeias.
