= Coele-Syria =

Region of Syria in classical antiquity

Coele-Syria Κοίλη Συρία
- Region of Macedonian Empire / Ptolemaic Kingdom / Seleucid Empire/ Kingdom of Greater Armenia
- 332 BCE–64 BCE
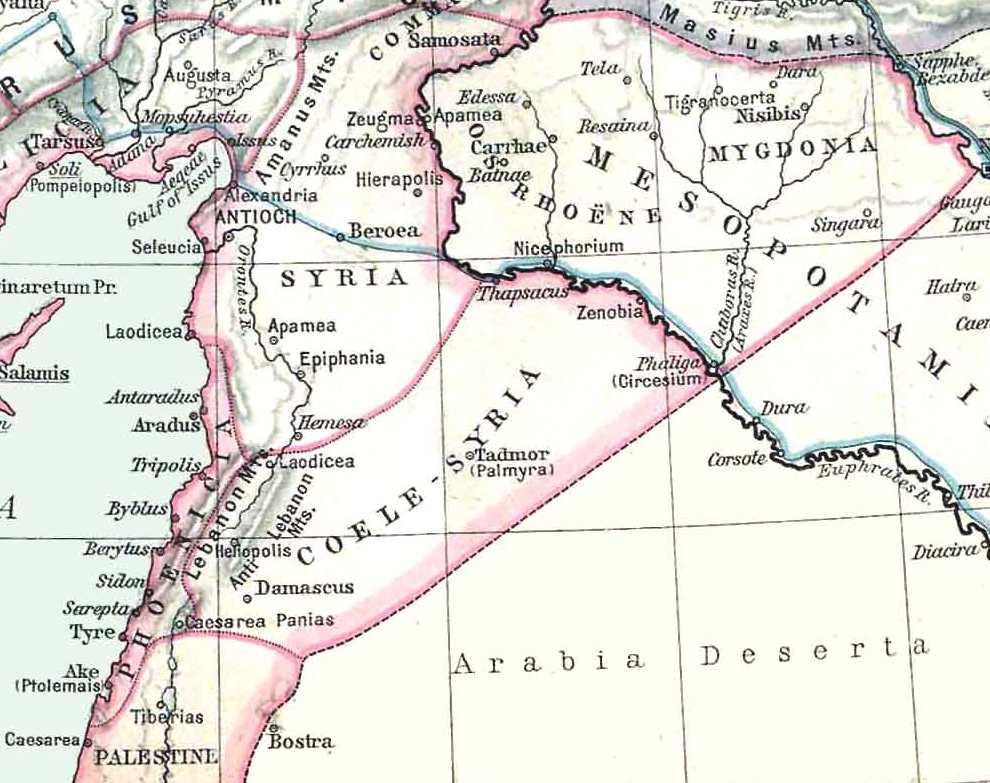
- Historical era: Hellenistic era
  - Conquests of Alexander the Great: 332 BCE
  - Syrian Wars: 274–168 BCE
  - Hasmonean Kingdom: 140 BCE
  - Conquests of Pompey: 64 BCE
Preceded by
| Eber-Nari |
| Achaemenid Phoenicia |
| Yehud Medinata |
Succeeded by
| Roman Syria |
| Hasmonean kingdom |
| Decapolis |

Coele-Syria (Ancient Greek: Κοίλη Συρία, romanized: Koílē Syría, lit. 'Hollow Syria') was a region of Syria in classical antiquity. The term originally referred to the "hollow" Beqaa Valley between the Lebanon and the Anti-Lebanon mountain ranges, but sometimes it was applied to a broader area of the region of Syria. The area is now part of modern-day Syria and Lebanon.

== Name ==
It is widely accepted that the term Coele is a transcription of the Semitic (Aramaic: ܟܠ) kul 'all, the entire', such that the term originally identified all of Syria, the region between the Euphrates, Mediterranean, and Taurus. The word "Coele", with κοῖλος (koĩlos), fem. κοίλη (koílē) literally meaning 'hollow' in Ancient and Koine Greek, is thought to have come about via a folk-etymological reinterpretation referring to the "hollow" Beqaa Valley between Mount Lebanon and the Anti-Lebanon Mountains. However, the term Coele-Syria was also used in a wider sense to indicate 'all Syria' or 'all Syria except Phoenicia', by the writers Pliny, Arrian, Ptolemy and also Diodorus Siculus, who indicated Coele-Syria to at least stretch as far south as Joppa, while Polybius stated that the border between Egypt and Coele-Syria lay between the towns of Rhinocolara and Rhaphia.

The first and only official use of the term was during the period of Seleucid rule of the region, between c. 200 BCE and 64 BCE. During this period, the term Coele Syria and Phoenicia or Coele Syria was also used in a narrower sense to refer to the former Ptolemaic territory which the Seleucids now controlled, being the area south of the river Eleutherus. This usage was adopted by Strabo and the Books of the Maccabees. Later during the Roman period c. 350 CE, Eunapius wrote that the capital of Coele-Syria was the Seleucid city of Antioch, north of the Eleutherus.

== Official usage ==
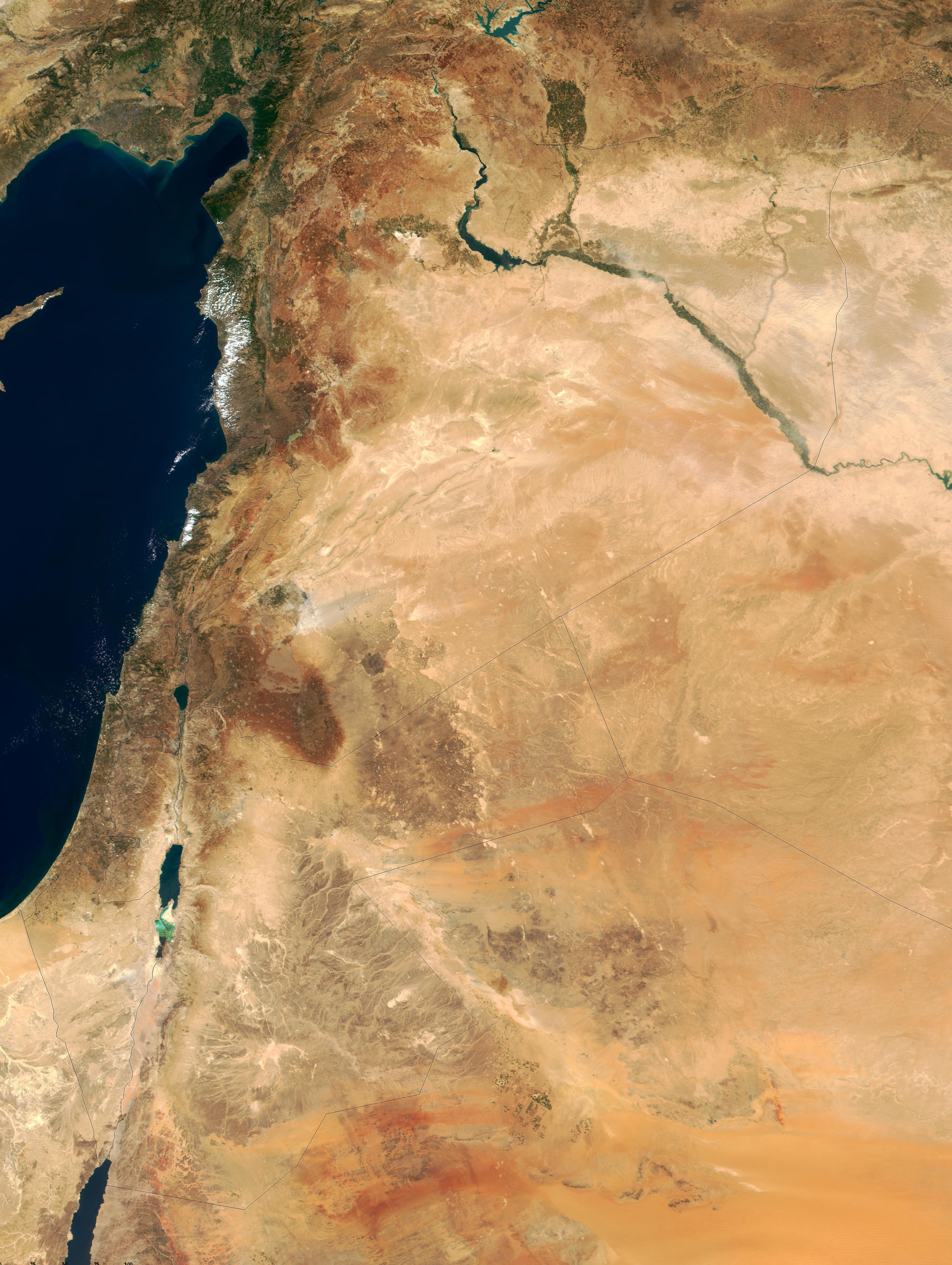

According to Polybius, a former officer of the Ptolemaic Empire named Ptolemy Thrasea, having fought in the 217 BCE Battle of Raphia, defected to the Seleucid king Antiochus III the Great. Antiochus gave him the title "Strategos and Archiereus of Coele-Syria and Phoenicia". Some scholars speculate that this title may have been used previously by the Ptolemies, but no direct evidence exists to support this.

== Syrian Wars ==
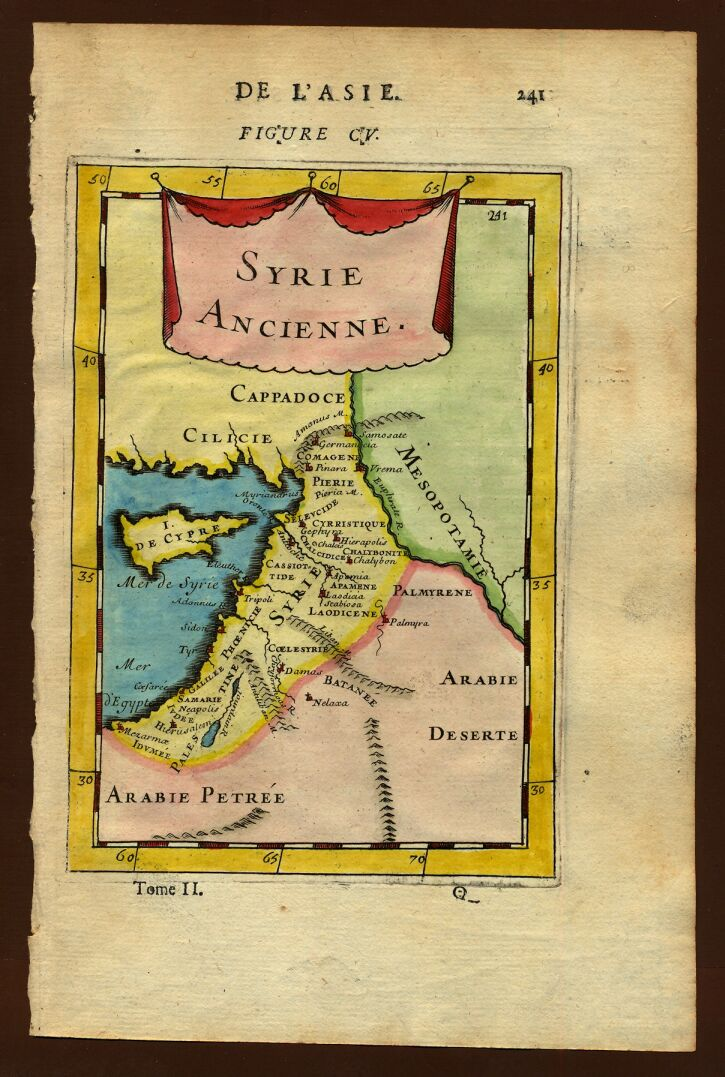
Map of ancient Syria

The region was disputed between the Seleucid dynasty and the Ptolemaic dynasty during the Syrian Wars. Alexander the Great's general Ptolemy first occupied Coele-Syria in 318 BC. However, when Ptolemy joined the coalition against Antigonus I Monophthalmus in 313 BC, he quickly withdrew from Coele-Syria. In 312 BC Seleucus I Nicator, defeated Demetrius, the son of Antigonus, in the Battle of Gaza which again allowed Ptolemy to occupy Coele-Syria. Though he was again to pull out after only a few months, after Demetrius had won a battle over his general and Antigonus entered Syria in force up to Antigonuses, this brief success had enabled Seleucus to make a dash for Babylonia which Seleucus secured. Antigonus administered the region through his appointee Hieronymus of Cardia, whom Josephus records as having been placed in charge of (Coele) Syria. In 302 BC, Ptolemy joined a new coalition against Antigonus and reoccupied Coele-Syria, but quickly withdrew on hearing a false report that Antigonus had won a victory. He was only to return when Antigonus had been defeated at Ipsus in 301 BC. Coele-Syria was assigned to Seleucus, by the victors of Ipsus, as Ptolemy had added nothing to the victory. Though, given Ptolemy's track record, he was unlikely to organize a serious defense of Coele-Syria, Seleucus acquiesced in Ptolemy's occupation, probably because Seleucus remembered how it had been with Ptolemy's help he had reestablished himself in Babylonia.

The later Seleucids were not to be so understanding, resulting in the century of Syrian Wars between the Ptolemies and Seleucids. The Battle of Panium in 200 BC, during the Fifth Syrian War, was the final decisive battle between the two sides in ending Ptolemaic control over the region. The 171–168 BC conflicts over Coele-Syria, between Antiochus IV Epiphanes and Ptolemy VI Philometor, are discussed in Livy's history of Rome (in XLII. A total of 29 and XLV. 11–12).

Seleucid control over the area of Judea began diminishing with the eruption of the Maccabean Revolt in 165 BC. With Seleucid troops being involved in warfare on the Parthian front, Judea succeeded in securing its independence by 140 BC. Despite attempts of Seleucid rulers to regain territories, the conquests of Pompey in 64 BC were a decisive blow to them, and Syria became part of the Roman Republic.

== Nomenclatures of Syria ==
Judging from Arrian and The Anabasis of Alexander, the historians of Alexander the Great, as well as more ancient authors, gave the name of Syria to all the country comprehended between the Tigris and the Mediterranean. The part to the east of the Euphrates, afterwards named Mesopotamia was called "Syria between the rivers;" that to the west was called by the general name Coele-Syria, and although Phoenicia and Palestine were sometimes separated from it. Yet, it was often comprehended as the whole country as far as Egypt.

Nomenclatures of Syria given in the time of Cyrus the Great c. 530 BCE
| Primary | Kul Eber-Nari | All Across-the-River |
| Alternate | Koile Syria | Corrupt Greek translation |

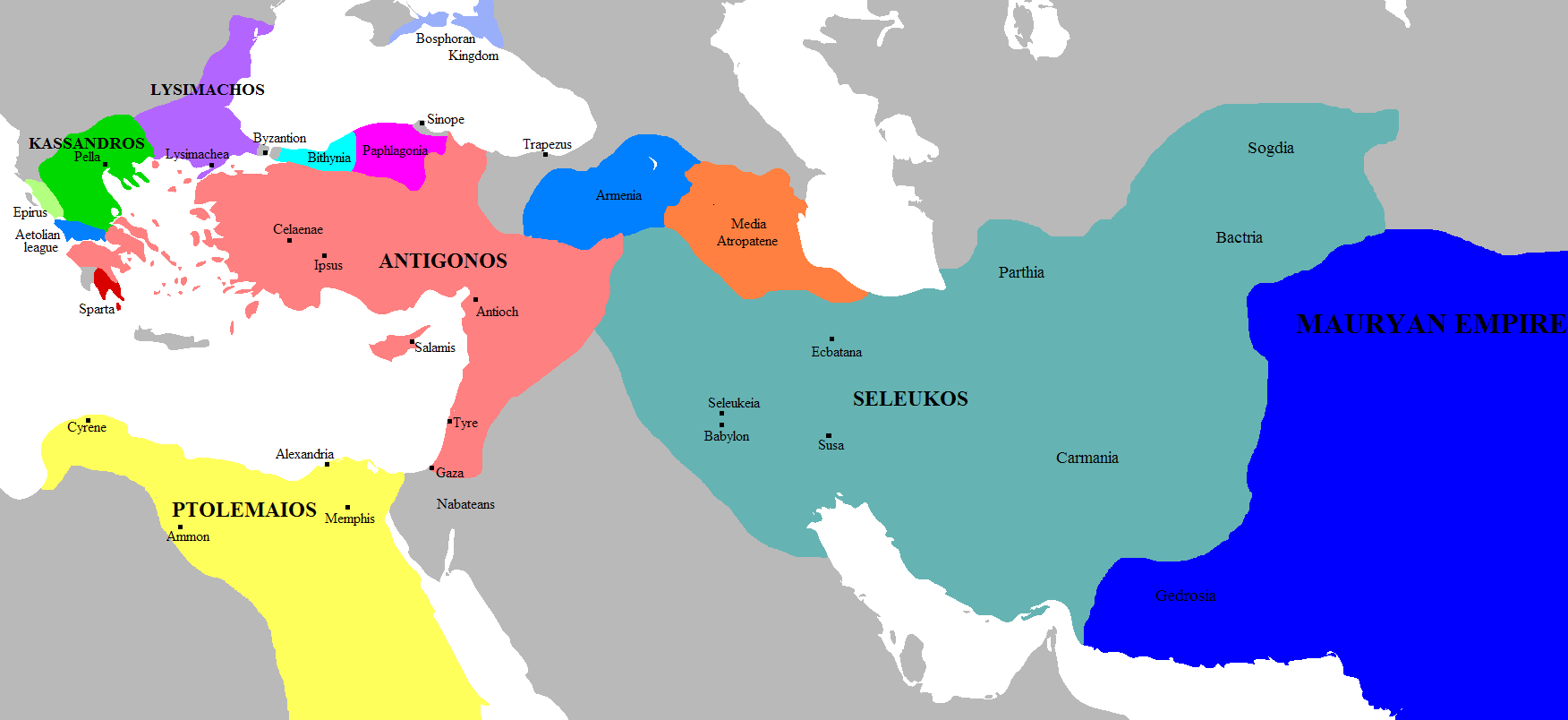
The Kingdoms of Antigonos and his rivals c. 303 BC.

- Circa 323 BCE Laomedon of Mytilene takes control of Coele-Syria (dissolving Eber-Nari).
- Circa 323 BCE The Periplus of Pseudo-Scylax lists several cities on the Palestinian coast (Dor, Jaffa, Ascalon, and Acre) that are incorporated into Coele-Syria.

In the Wars of the Diadochi, Coele-Syria came under the control of Antigonus I Monophthalmus. According to Josephus, Antigonus placed Hieronymus of Cardia in charge of Syria during this period. Billows has argued that Hieronymus should more specifically be regarded as governor of Coele-Syria. Then in 301 BCE, Ptolemy I Soter exploited events surrounding the Battle of Ipsus to take control of the region. The victors at Ipsus finalized the breakup of Alexander's empire. Coele-Syria was allocated to Ptolemy's former ally Seleucus I Nicator, who—having been previously aided by Ptolemy—took no military action to gain control of the region. Their successors, however, became embroiled in a series of conflicts over this issue.

Wars over Coele-Syria given by Polybius c. 150 BCE

Ptolemy, marching on Pelusium, made his first halt at that city, and after picking up stragglers and serving out rations to his men moved on marching through the desert and skirting Mount Casius and the marshes called Barathra. Reaching the spot he was bound for on the fifth day he encamped at a distance of fifty stades from Raphia, (Modern Rafah at the border of Egypt and Israel, north of Rhinocolara (El Arish)) which is the first city of Coele-Syria on the Egyptian side after Rhinocolura.

- Circa 120 BCE In the written work, 1 Maccabees ;
  And king Demetrius made Apollonius his general, who was governor of Celesyria: and he gathered together a great army, and came to Jamnia.
- Circa 100 BCE In the written work, 2 Maccabees ;
  And when he could not overcome Onias, he went to Apollonius, the son of Tharseas, who at that time was governor of Celesyria, and Phenicia.

Boundaries of Egypt given by Diodorus Siculus c. 50 BCE

Having spoken of the three boundaries of Egypt, by which it is distinguished from the rest of the continent, we now proceed to the next. The fourth side is nearly surrounded with a vast sea, without any harbours, being a very long and tedious voyage, and very difficult to find any place of landing. For from Parcetonium in Africa, to Joppa in Cœlo-Syria, for the space almost of five thousand furlongs, there is not one safe harbour to be found, except Pharus.

- Circa 25 BCE Livy in his history of Rome ;
  Antiochus was so incensed, ...He at once sent his fleet to Cyprus, and in the first days of spring set his army in motion for Egypt and advanced into Coelo-Syria. When near Rhinocolura he was met by envoys from Ptolemy, who ...begged him to say clearly what he wanted rather than to attack Ptolemy as an enemy—by force of arms—after previously being his friend.

=== Coele-Syria Proper ===
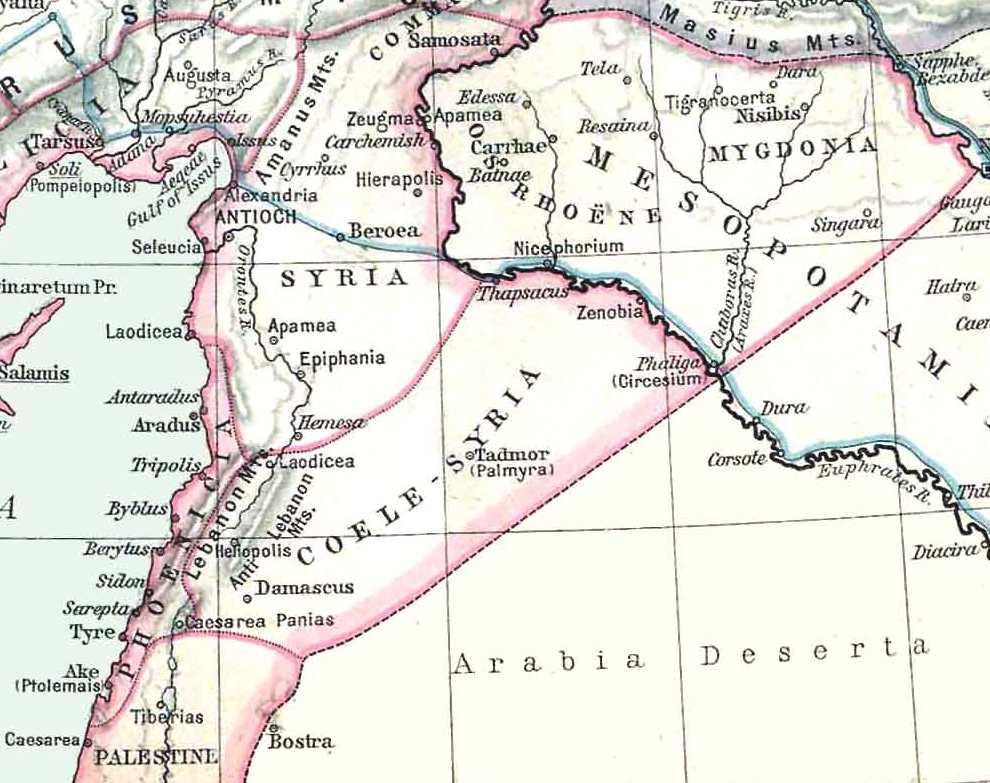
Coele Syria

Authors of the Roman period differ on the limits of Coele-Syria, some extending and others contracting them. The Geography of Strabo notes that Coele Syria Propria (Proper) is defined by the Libanus and Anti-libanus mountain ranges, running parallel to each other. In the wars between the Ptolemies and the Seleucidæ, the name Cœle Syria was applied to the whole of the southern portion of Syria, but under the Romans, it was confined to "Cœlesyria Proper" and variously included the district east of Anti-Libanus, about Damascus, and a portion of Palestine east of the Jordan river (possibly of: Trans-Jordan, Perea, or the Decapolis).

Nomenclatures of Syria given by Strabo c. 10 BCE
| Primary | Cœlê-Syria & Seleucis-Syria & Phœnicia &c. &c. | Cœlê-Syria ≠ Cœlo-Syrians |
| Alternate | Cœlo-Syrians & Syrians & Phœnicians | Similar to nomenclature given by Herodotus |

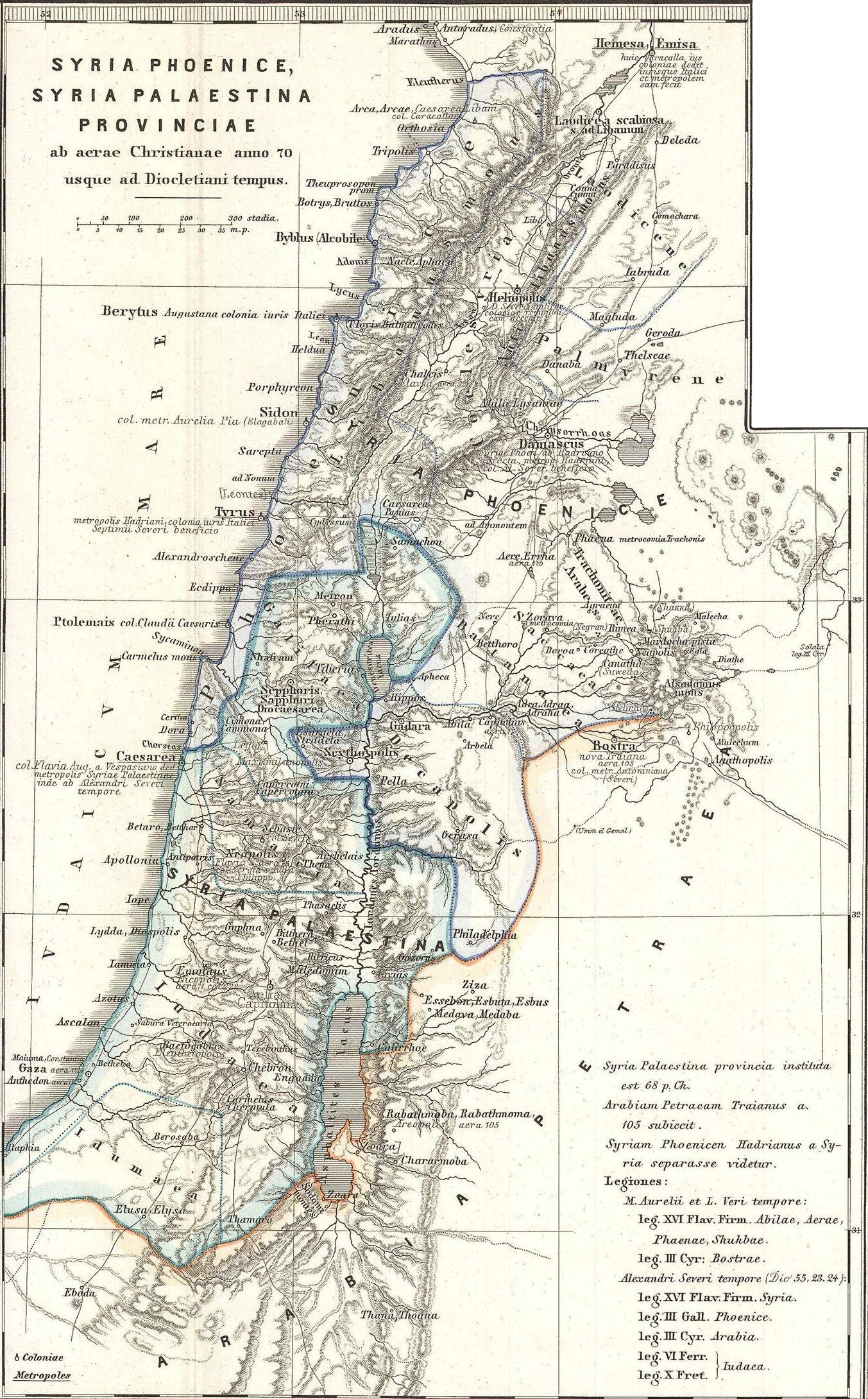
SYRIA post 70 CE

- Circa 36 CE Philo of Alexandria in his written work, On the Life of Moses ;
  When then [Moses] he received the supreme authority, with the good will of all his subjects, God himself being the regulator and approver of all his actions, he conducted his people as a colony into Phoenicia, and into the hollow Syria (Coele-syria), and Palestine, which was at that time called the land of the Canaanites, the borders of which country were three days' journey distant from Egypt.
- Circa 43 CE Pomponius Mela in his written work, Description of the World ;
  Syria holds a broad expanse of the littoral, as well as lands that extend rather broadly into the interior, and it is designated by different names in different places. For example, it is called Coele, Mesopotamia, Judaea, Commagene, and Sophene. It is Palestine at the point where Syria abuts the Arabs, then Phoenicia, and then—where it reaches Cilicia—Antiochia. [...] In Palestine, however, is Gaza, a mighty and well fortified city.

The name Syria comes from the ancient Greek regional name for the Levantine colonies and colonial territories which they had established and which were "formerly comprehended as part of Assyria" (see Name of Syria). Syria had an uncertain border to the northeast that Pliny the Elder describes as including from west to east; Commagene, Sophene, and Adiabene. In Pliny's time, Syria was administratively divided into a number of provinces with various degrees of autonomy under the Roman Empire, such as the Ityraei or Ituraei, who were a people of Coelo-Syria famous for shooting with a bow, [The wood of the trees called] "yews are bent into Ituraean bows".

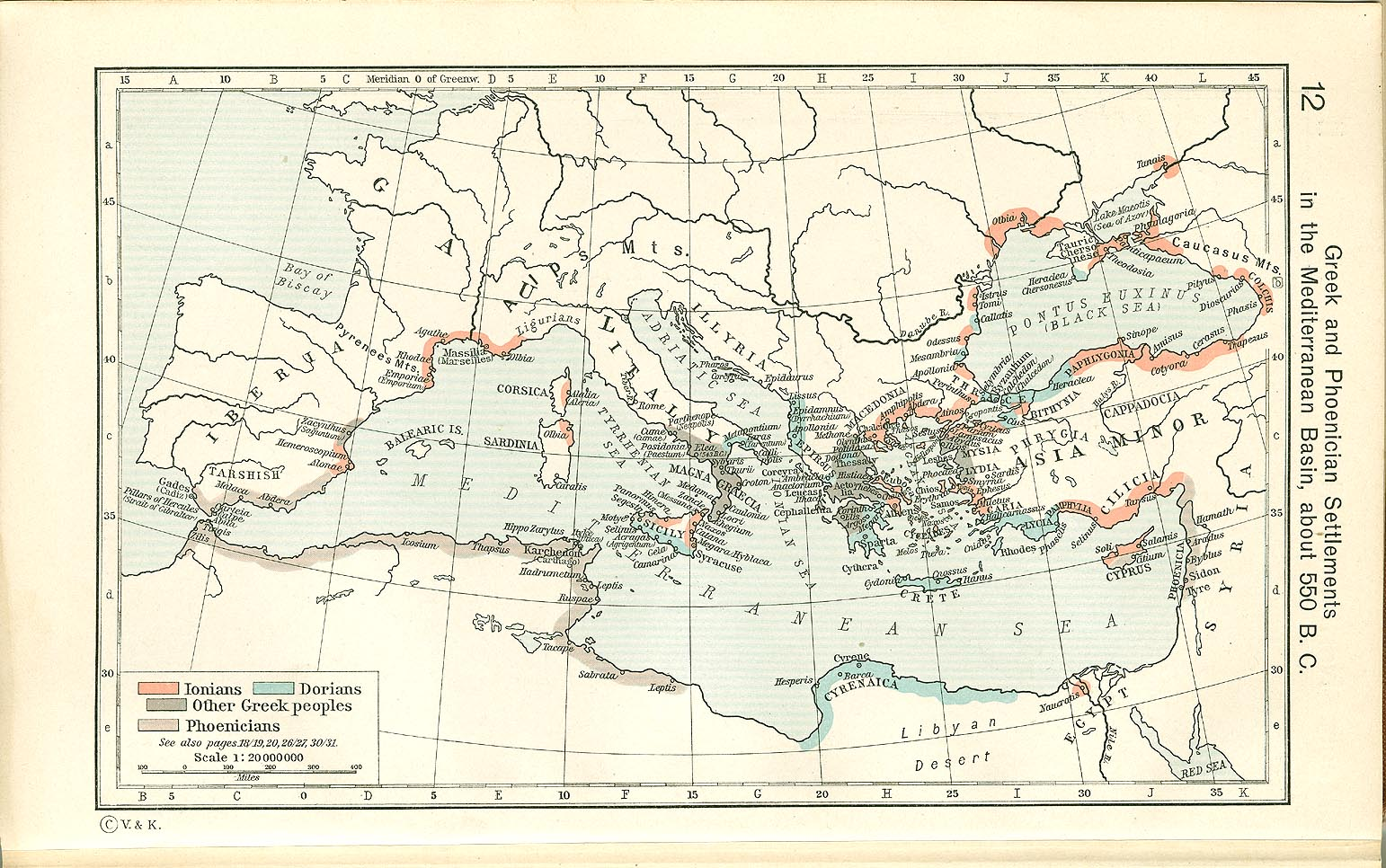
Greek colonies

Nomenclatures of Syria given by Pliny the Elder c.70 CE
| Primary | Syria | deprecated terms: Palæstina, Judæa, Cœle, Phœnice |
| Alternate | Syria & Phœnice | |

- Circa 70 CE Pliny the Elder in his written work, Natural History ;
  Next to these countries on the coast is Syria, once the greatest of lands. It had a multitude of divisions with different names, the part adjacent to Arabia was previously known as Palestine (whose northernmost city was Caesarea, Plin. NH 5.69: "Caesarea ..finis Palastine") or Judaea or Cœle.
- Circa 100 CE Josephus in his written work, Antiquities of the Jews, notes that in 46 BCE Herod the Great was appointed as the "stratēgos" of Coele Syria, by the governor of Syria, Sextus Julius Caesar. And he also writes ;
  Antiochus made a friendship and league with Ptolemy, and gave him his daughter Cleopatra in marriage, and yielded up to him Cœle-Syria and Samaria and Judæa and Phœnicia by way of dowry.
- Circa 125 CE The Roman emperor Hadrian promotes the city of Damascus to "Metropolis of Coele-Syria".

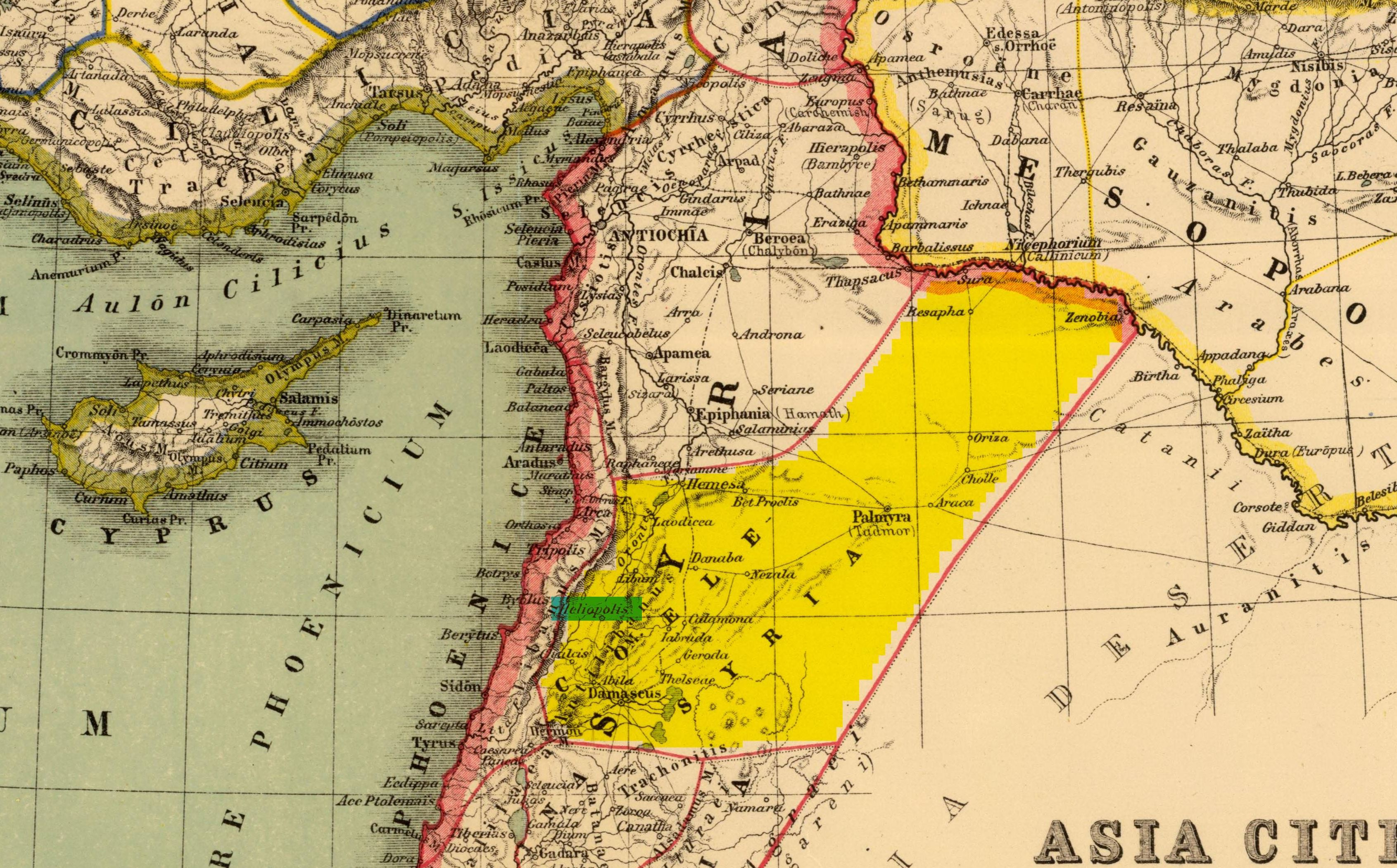
Coele Syria. Heliopolis

- Circa 150 CE Appian in his written work, Roman History ;
  Intending to write the history of the Romans, I have deemed it necessary to begin with the boundaries of the nations under their sway.... Here turning our course and passing round, we take in Palestine-Syria, and beyond it a part of Arabia. The Phoenicians hold the country next to Palestine on the sea, and beyond the Phoenician territory are Coele-Syria, and the parts stretching from the sea as far inland as the river Euphrates, namely Palmyra and the sandy country round about, extending even to the Euphrates itself.

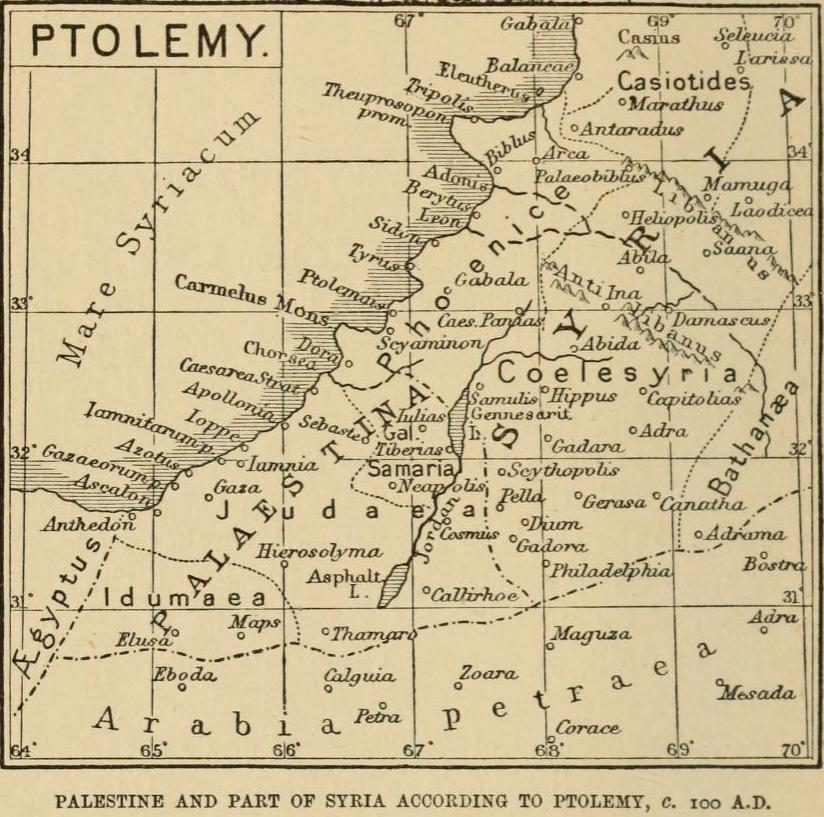
Palestine & Coele-Syria according to Ptolemy (map by Claude Reignier Conder of the Palestine Exploration Fund)

The Decapolis was so called from its ten cities enumerated by Pliny. What Pliny calls Decapolis, Ptolemy makes his Cœle-Syria; and the Cœle-Syria of Pliny, is that part of Syria about Aleppo.

Towns in Coelesyria given by Ptolemy c. 150 CE that are distinct from Pliny's Decapolis

1. Heliopolis
2. Abila which is called Lysinia (Abila Lysanios)
3. Saana
4. Ina
5. Samulis (Samoulis)
6. Abida
7. Capitolias
8. Adra
9. Canatha

=== Provincia Syria Coele ===
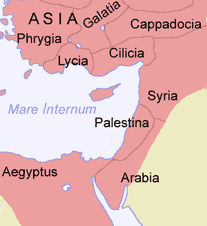
The Roman provinces of Syria, Palestina, and Arabia

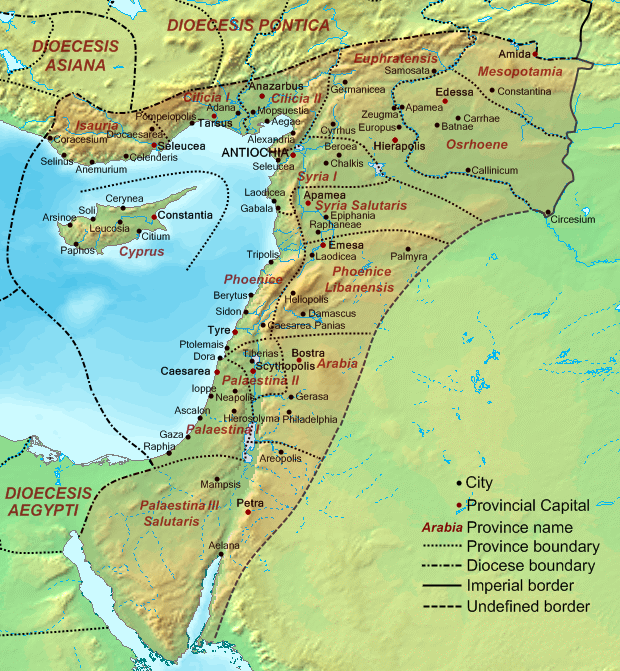
Dioecesis Orientis (East) 400 CE

The governor of Syria retained the civil administration of the whole large province undiminished, and held for long alone in all Asia a command of the first rank. It was only in the course of the second century that a diminution of his prerogatives occurred, when Hadrian took one of the four legions from the governor of Syria and handed it over to the governor of Palestine. It was Severus who at length withdrew the first place in the Roman military hierarchy from the Syrian governor. After having subdued the province —which had wished at that time to make Niger emperor, as it had formerly done with its governor Vespasian —amidst resistance from the capital Antioch in particular, he ordained its partition into a northern and a southern half, and gave to the governor of the former, which was called Coele-Syria, two legions, to the governor of the latter, the province of Syro-Phoenicia, one [legion].

Nomenclature of Syria given in the time of Septimius Severus c.200 CE
| Syria | Provincia Syria Coele | Syria Coele ≠ Cœlê-Syria ≠ Cœlo-Syrians |
| Phoenice | Provincia Syria Phoenice | |
| Palestina | Provincia Syria Palæstina | |
| Arabia | Provincia Arabia Petraea | |

- Circa 200 CE. Ulpian, On Taxes, Book I;

There is also the colony of Laodicea, in Coele Syria, to which also the divine Severus granted the Italian Law on account of its services in the Civil War.

Boundaries of the 'Promised Land' given by Jerome c. 400 CE

You may delineate the Promised Land of Moses from the Book of Numbers (ch. 34): as bounded on the south by the desert tract called Sina, between the Dead Sea and the city of Kadesh-barnea, [which is located with the Arabah to the east] and continues to the west, as far as the river of Egypt, that discharges into the open sea near the city of Rhinocolara; as bounded on the west by the sea along the coasts of Palestine, Phoenicia, Coele-Syria, and Cilicia; as bounded on the north by the circle formed by the Taurus Mountains and Zephyrium and extending to Hamath, called Epiphany-Syria; as bounded on the east by the city of Antioch Hippos and Lake Kinneret, now called Tiberias, and then the Jordan River which discharges into the salt sea, now called the Dead Sea.

- Circa 400 CE Eunapius in his written work, Lives of Philosophers and Sophists ;

Libanius (died 392 CE) was born at Antioch, the capital of Coele Syria as it is called. This city was founded by Seleucus surnamed Nicator.

- Capital of the Seleucid Empire was Antioch (240–63 BCE)
- Capital of the Syria Coele (Roman province) was Antioch (200–600 CE)

== See also ==
- Hellenistic Palestine
