= Battle of Magnesia =

190/89 BCE battle in which Rome and Pergamon defeated the Seleucids

Coordinates: 38.6167°N 27.4333°E

- Part of the Roman–Seleucid war
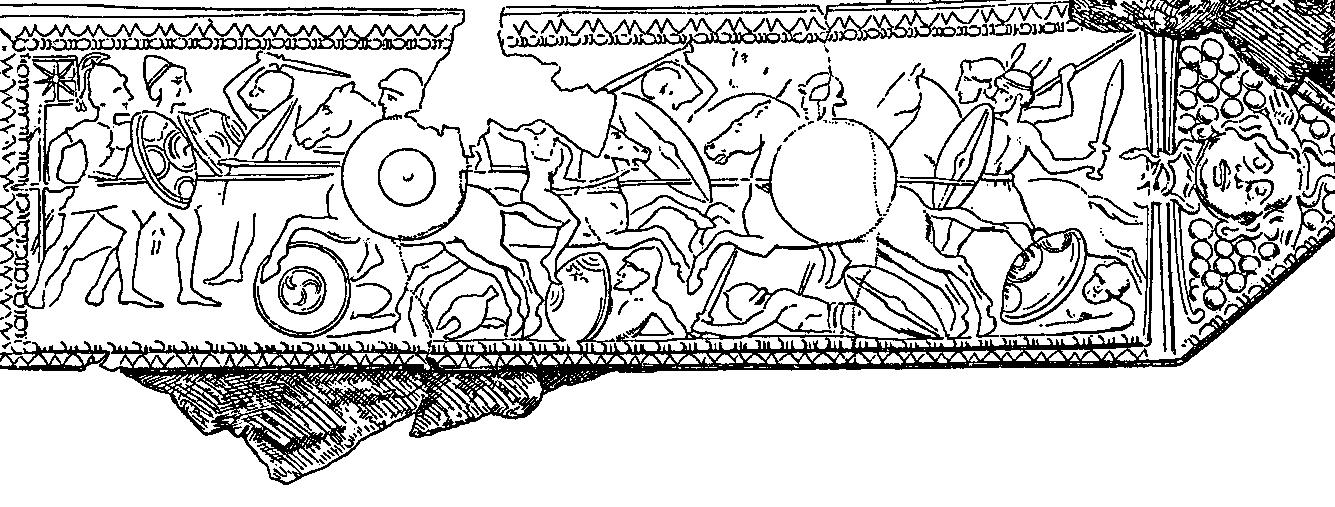
- Illustration of a bronze plaque from Pergamon, likely depicting the Battle of Magnesia
Date	December 190 or January 189 BC
Location	Near Magnesia ad Sipylum (modern-day Manisa, Turkey)
Result	Roman-Pergamene victory

Belligerents
Roman Republic; Kingdom of Pergamon	Seleucid Empire

Commanders and leaders
Lucius Cornelius Scipio; Eumenes II of Pergamon	Antiochus III the Great; Zeuxis; Seleucus

Strength
30,000 (ancient sources); 30,000 – 50,000 (modern estimates); 16 war elephants	72,000 (ancient sources); 50,000 – 72,000 (modern estimates); 54 war elephants

Casualties and losses
349 dead and many wounded (ancient sources); 5,000 dead (modern estimates)	53,000 dead as well as 1,400 and 15 war elephants captured (ancient sources); 10,000 dead (modern estimates)
- Location of the Battle of Magnesia Battle of Magnesia (Turkey)

The Battle of Magnesia took place in either December 190 or January 189 BC. It was fought as part of the Roman–Seleucid War, pitting forces of the Roman Republic led by the consul Lucius Cornelius Scipio Asiaticus and the allied Kingdom of Pergamon under Eumenes II against a Seleucid army of Antiochus III the Great. The two armies initially camped northeast of Magnesia ad Sipylum in Asia Minor (modern-day Manisa, Turkey), attempting to provoke each other into a battle on favorable terrain for several days.

When the battle finally began, Eumenes managed to throw the Seleucid left flank into disarray. While Antiochus' cavalry overpowered his adversaries on the right flank of the battlefield, his army's center collapsed before he could reinforce it. Modern estimates give 10,000 dead for the Seleucids and 5,000 killed for the Romans. The battle resulted in a decisive Roman-Pergamene victory, which led to the Treaty of Apamea that ended Seleucid domination in Asia Minor.

== Background ==
Following his return from his Bactrian (210-209 BC) and Indian (206-205 BC) campaigns, Antiochus forged an alliance with Philip V of Macedon, seeking to jointly conquer the territories of the Ptolemaic Kingdom. In 198 BC, he was victorious in the Fifth Syrian War, taking over Coele-Syria and securing his southeastern border. He then focused his attention on Asia Minor, launching a successful campaign against coastal Ptolemaic possessions. In 196 BC, Antiochus used the opportunity of Attalus I's death to assault cities controlled by the Attalid dynasty. Fearing that Antiochus would seize the entirety of Asia Minor, the independent cities of Smyrna and Lampsacus appealed for protection from the Roman Republic. In the early spring of 196 BC, Antiochus' troops crossed to the European side of the Hellespont and began rebuilding the strategically important city of Lysimachia. In October 196 BC, Antiochus met with a delegation of Roman diplomats in Lysimachia. The Romans demanded that Antiochus withdraw from Europe and restore the autonomous status of Greek city-states in Asia Minor. Antiochus countered by claiming that he was simply rebuilding the empire of his ancestor Antiochus II Theos and criticized the Romans for meddling in the affairs of the Asia Minor states whose rights were traditionally defended by Rhodes.

In late winter 196/195 BC, Rome's erstwhile chief enemy, Carthaginian general Hannibal, fled from Carthage to Antiochus' court in Ephesus. Despite the emergence of a pro-war party led by Scipio Africanus, the Roman Senate exercised restraint. The Seleucids expanded their holdings in Thrace from Perinthus to Maroneia at the expense of the Thracian tribesmen. Negotiations between the Romans and the Seleucids resumed, coming to a standstill once again over differences between Greek and Roman law on the status of disputed territorial possessions. In the summer of 193 BC, a representative of the Aetolian League assured Antiochus that the Aetolians would take his side in a future war with Rome, while Antiochus gave tacit support to Hannibal's plans of launching an anti-Roman coup d'état in Carthage. The Aetolians began spurring the Greek states to jointly revolt under Antiochus' leadership against the Romans, hoping to provoke a war between the two parties. The Aetolians then captured the strategically important port city of Demetrias, killing the key members of the local pro-Roman faction. In September 192 BC, the Aetolian general Thoantas arrived at Antiochus' court, convincing him to openly oppose the Romans in Greece. The Seleucids raised 10,000 infantry, 500 cavalry, 6 war elephants, and 300 ships for their campaign in Greece.

== Prelude ==
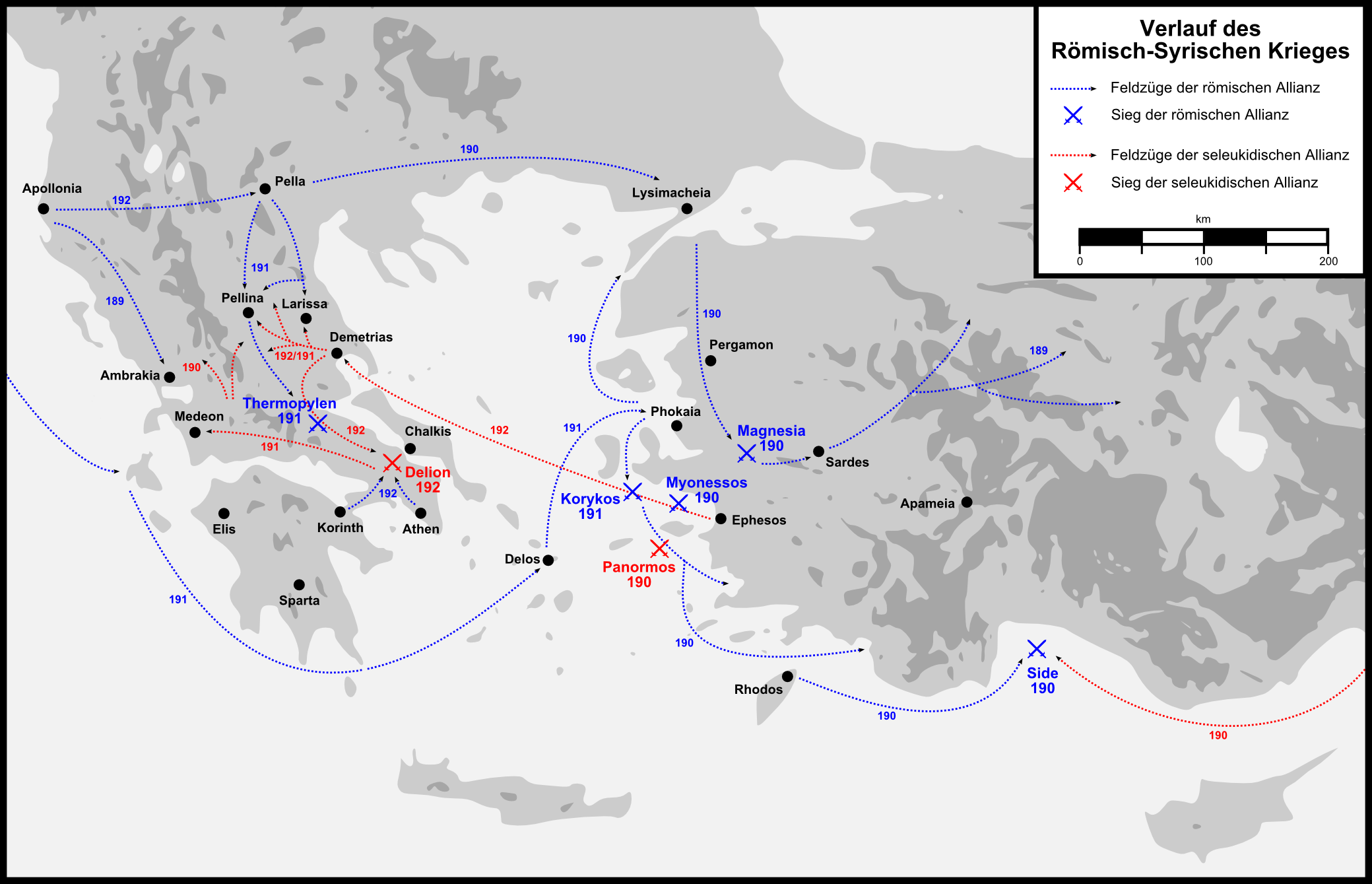
The course of the war, with locations of key battles

The Seleucid fleet sailed via Imbros and Skiathos, arriving at Demetrias where Antiochus' army disembarked. The Achaean League declared war on the Seleucids and Aetolians with the Romans following suit in November 192 BC. Antiochus forced Chalcis to open its gates to him, turning the city into his base of operations. Antiochus then shifted his attention towards rebuilding his alliance with Philip V of Macedon, which had been shattered after the latter was decisively defeated by the Romans at the Battle of Cynoscephalae in 197 BC. Philip expected that the Romans would emerge victorious in the conflict and counted on territorial rewards as well as the writing off of war reparations that he owed them; the Seleucids could provide neither, so Antiochus' overtures were rejected and Philip aligned himself with the Romans. Between December 192 and March 191 BC, Antiochus campaigned in Thessaly and Acarnania.

A combined counter-offensive conducted by the Romans and their Macedonian allies erased all of Antiochus' gains in Thessaly within a month. On 26 April 191 BC, the two sides faced off at the Battle of Thermopylae, where Antiochus' army suffered a devastating defeat and he returned to Ephesus shortly afterwards. The Seleucids then attempted to destroy the Roman fleet before it could unite with those of Rhodes and the Attalids. However, the Roman fleet defeated the Seleucids in the Battle of Corycus in September 191 BC, enabling it to take control of several cities including Dardanus and Sestos on the Hellespont. In May 190 BC, Antiochus invaded Pergamon, ravaging the countryside, besieging its capital and forcing Eumenes to return from Greece. In August 190 BC, the Rhodians defeated Hannibal's fleet at the Battle of the Eurymedon. A month later a combined Roman-Rhodean fleet defeated the Seleucids at the Battle of Myonessus. The Seleucids could no longer control the Aegean Sea, opening the way for a Roman invasion of Asia Minor. Antiochus withdrew his armies from Thrace, while simultaneously offering to cover half of the Roman war expenses and accept the demands made in Lysimachia in 196 BC. By this time, however, the Romans were determined to crush the Seleucids once and for all. As the Roman forces reached Maroneia, Antiochus began preparing for a final decisive battle. The Romans advanced through Dardanus to the River Caecus where they united with Eumenes’ army.

== Armies ==
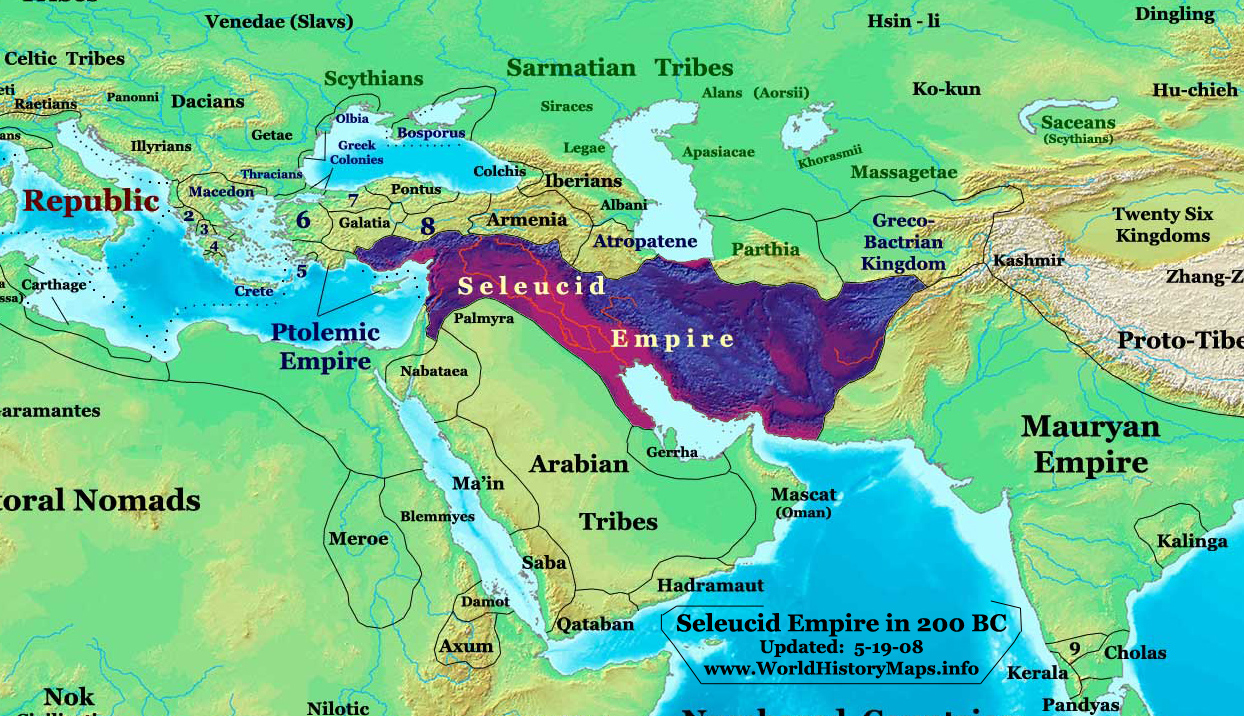
The Seleucid Empire in 200 BC (before expansion into Anatolia and Greece)

The two main historical accounts of the battle come from Livy’s Ab Urbe Condita Libri and Appian's Syriaca. Both of these authors agree that the Roman army was about 30,000 men strong and the Seleucids fielded approximately 72,000 soldiers. However, modern historians disagree on the issue, with some believing the estimates in the primary sources, while others claim that the two armies might have each numbered some 50,000 men. Additionally, the Romans had 16 war elephants at their disposal, while the Seleucids fielded 54. A popular anecdote regarding the array of the two armies is that Antiochus supposedly asked Hannibal whether his vast and well-armed formation would be enough for the Roman Republic, to which Hannibal tartly replied, "Quite enough for the Romans, however greedy they are."

The left wing of the Seleucid army was commanded by Antiochus' son Seleucus and his nephew Antipater. It was composed of Cyrtians armed with slings, Elymaean archers, 4,000 peltasts, 1,500 Illyrians, 1,500 Carians and Cilicians, and 1,000 Neocretans. The rest of the left wing consisted of 2,500 Galatian and 500 Tarentine light cavalry, 1,000 royal cavalry, 3,000 cataphracts, 2,000 Cappadocian infantry, 16 war elephants, and a miscellaneous force of 2,700 light infantry. The center was formed by a 16,000-strong Macedonian phalanx, commanded by Philip, the master of the elephants. It was deployed into ten 1,600-man taxeis, each 50 men wide and 32 men deep. Twenty war elephants were separated into pairs and deployed in the gaps between the taxeis, further supported by 1,500 Galatian and 1,500 Atian infantry. The right flank was led by Antiochus, consisting of 3,000 cataphracts, 1,000 agema cavalry, 1,000 argyraspides of the royal guard, 1,200 Dahae horse archers, 2,500 Mysian archers, 3,000 Cretan and Illyrian light infantry, 4,500 Cyrtian slingers and Elymaean archers as well as a reserve of 16 war elephants. Ahead of the main body, units of scythed chariots and a unit of camel-borne Arab archers were posted in front of the left flank, and to their immediate right, Minnionas and Zeuxis commanded 6,000 psiloi light infantry. The war camp was guarded by 7,000 of the least combat-ready Seleucid troops.

The left wing of the Romans was commanded by the legate Gnaeus Domitius Ahenobarbus. It numbered 10,800 heavy infantrymen drawn from among the Romans and Rome's socii, along with four cavalry companies of 100 to 120 men. The center likewise consisted of 10,800 Roman and Latin heavy infantrymen commanded personally by Scipio. The Roman infantry was divided into three lines, with the youngest soldiers standing at the front, in a more open and flexible formation than their adversaries. The right flank was led by Eumenes and comprised 2,800 to 3,000 cavalry, the majority being Romans supplemented by an 800-man Pergamene force. Ahead of the Roman main force were 3,000 Achaean and Pergamene light infantry and 800 Cretan and Illyrian archers. The rearguard was formed by 2,000 Thracian and Macedonian volunteers and 16 African war elephants that were considered inferior to the Asian war elephants deployed by the Seleucids.

== Battle ==
The battle took place either in December 190 BC or January 189 BC. The Romans advanced from Pergamon towards Thyatira where they expected to encounter Antiochus. Antiochus was determined to fight his adversaries on the ground of his own choosing, and his army marched from the direction of Sardis towards Magnesia ad Sipylum, camping 15 kilometres (9.3 mi) northeast of the city. Magnesia had already served as a battlefield for the Seleucids in 281 BC where they had emerged victorious in the Battle of Corupedium. Upon learning that the Seleucids had left Thyatira, the Romans marched for five days towards the River Phrygios, camping north of the River Hermos, 6.5 kilometres (4.0 mi) from the Seleucid camp. Antiochus dispatched a party of 1,000 Galatian and Dahae cavalry to lure the Romans into a more exposed position, but the Romans refused to be drawn out. Three days later, the Romans moved their camp into a horseshoe-shaped plain some 4 kilometres (2.5 mi) from the Seleucid camp, which was surrounded by the Phrygios and Hermos rivers on three sides, by which the Romans hoped to limit the effectiveness of the Seleucid cavalry. The Seleucids once again sent an elite 3,000-man detachment to harass the Romans.

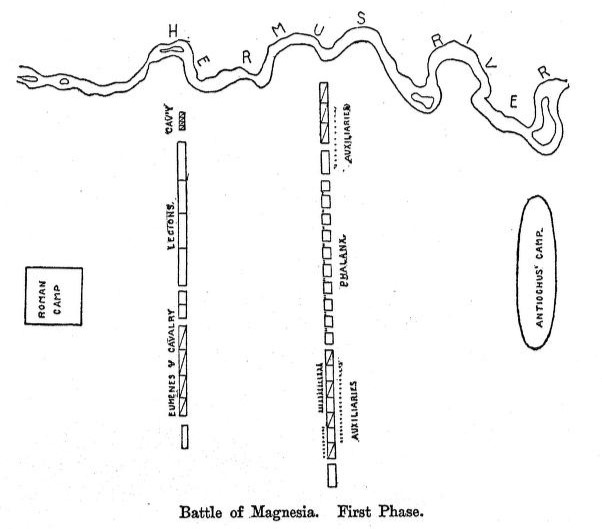
First phase of the battle

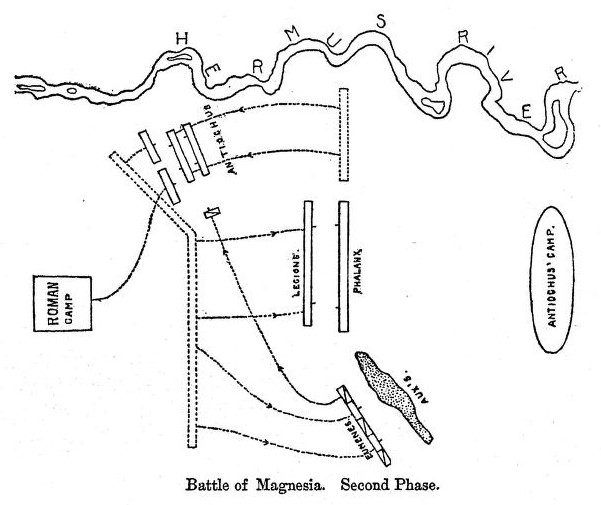
Second phase of the battle

During the following five days, the two armies lined up for battle, without engaging each other. Scipio found himself in a zugzwang. He could not hope to win the battle by directly assaulting the heavily-fortified Seleucid camp, but by refusing to engage he risked having his supply lines cut by the numerically-superior enemy cavalry. Turning back would have caused Roman morale to plunge as campaigns were halted during the winter. Additionally, Scipio wished to achieve a decisive victory over the Seleucids before a new consul was sent out from Rome to replace him. The Romans advanced to the point where the Phrygios made a 90-degree turn towards the north, leaving their right flank unprotected by the rivers. Antiochus was satisfied with the location, accepting the Roman challenge on the dawn of the third day after the last Roman advance.

The battle began on the Seleucid left flank when Eumenes sent forward his archers, slingers, and spearmen to harass the Seleucid scythed chariots. The latter began fleeing in panic after suffering heavy casualties, causing confusion among the camel-borne Arab archers and cataphracts positioned behind them. Eumenes then charged with his cavalry before the cataphracts could properly reorganize. The Roman and Pergamene cavalry broke through the Seleucid left flank, causing the cataphracts to flee to the Seleucid camp. The Galatians, Cappadocians, and mercenary infantry to the left of the phalanx faced a simultaneous attack from the Roman center and right, causing them to retreat and exposing the phalanx's left flank.

On the Seleucid right flank, Antiochus led the attack with the cataphracts and agema cavalry facing the Latin infantry, while the argyraspides engaged the Roman legionaries. The Roman infantry broke ranks retreating to their camp where they were reinforced by the Thracians and Macedonians and subsequently rallied by tribune Marcus Aemilius Lepidus. Antiochus's cavalry was unsuitable for taking the camp and he became bogged down in the fighting while his forces were badly needed elsewhere. In the center, the Seleucid phalanx held its ground against the Roman infantry, but it was not mobile enough to dislodge the enemy archers and slingers who bombarded it with projectiles. It began a slow organized retreat, when the war elephants positioned between its taxeis panicked because of the projectiles, causing the phalanx to break formation. The phalangites discarded their weapons and abandoned the battlefield. By the time Antiochus' cavalry had returned to reinforce the center his army had already dispersed. He gathered the surviving troops and retreated to Sardes while the Romans were busy looting his camp.

== Aftermath ==
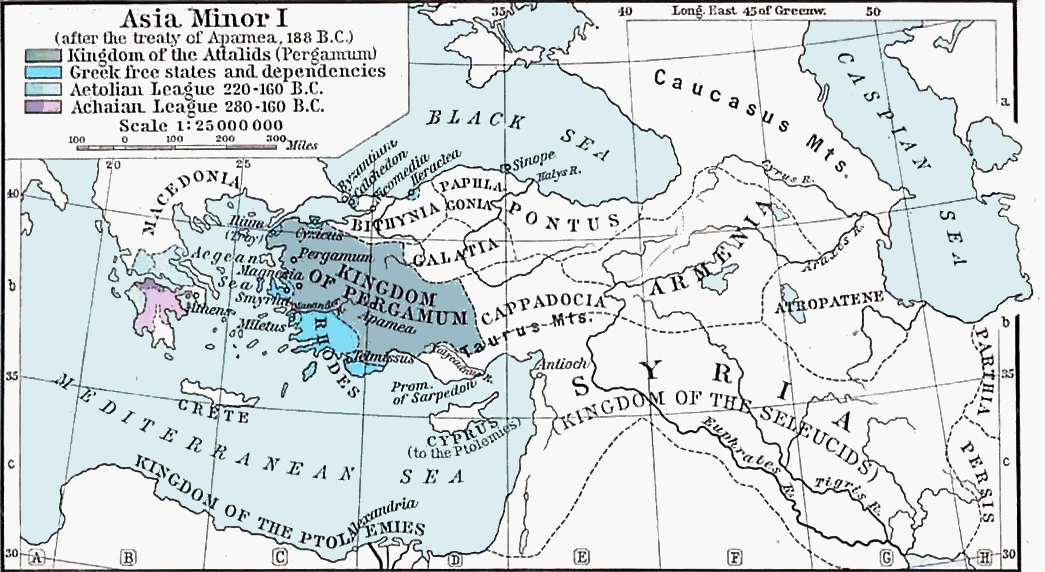
The reduced empire (titled: Syria, Kingdom of the Seleucids) and the expanded states of Pergamum and Rhodes, after the defeat of Antiochus III by Rome. Circa 188 BC.

Antiochus' defeat at Magnesia marked the end of the Macedonian phalanx's dominance on Hellenistic period battlefields. According to Livy 53,000 Seleucid soldiers perished, with 1,400 being captured alongside 15 elephants. By comparison, Livy claims that the Romans lost 349 men with many more wounded. Modern estimates give 10,000 dead for the Seleucids and 5,000 killed for the Romans. Shortly after arriving at Sardes, Antiochus learnt that Seleucus had survived the battle and headed to Apamea to meet him. The defeat at Magnesia and the subsequent withdrawal of the Seleucid fleet from Ephesus to Patara led the garrisons of numerous cities including Sardes, Ephesus, Thyatira, and Magnesia ad Sipylum to surrender to the Romans. Antiochus dispatched Zeuxis and Antipater to the Romans, in order to secure a truce. The truce was signed at Sardes in January 189 BC, whereupon Antiochus agreed to abandon his claims on all lands west of the Taurus Mountains, paid a heavy war indemnity and promised to hand over Hannibal and other notable enemies of Rome from among his allies.

The Romans sought to subjugate Asia Minor and punish Antiochus' allies, starting the Galatian War. In mainland Greece they suppressed the Athamanians and Aetolians who broke the terms of a previous truce. During the summer of 189 BC, ambassadors from the Seleucid Empire, Pergamon, Rhodes, and other Asia Minor states held peace talks with the Roman Senate. Lycia and Caria were given to Rhodes, while the Attalids received Thrace and most of Asia Minor west of the Taurus. The independence of Asia Minor city-states that sided with the Romans before the Battle of Magnesia was guaranteed. Antiochus further agreed to withdraw all his troops from beyond the Taurus, and refuse passage and support to enemies of Rome. The conditions also included the requirement to hand over Hannibal, Thoantas, and twenty notables as hostages, destroy all his fleet apart from ten ships, and give Rome 40,500 modiuses of grain per year. The terms were put into effect in the summer of 188 BC with the signing of the Treaty of Apamea.

== Sources ==
- Bar-Kochva, Bezalel (1976). The Seleucid Army: Organization and Tactics in the Great Campaigns. Cambridge: Cambridge University Press. ISBN 9780521206679.
- Grainger, John (2002). The Roman War of Antiochus the Great. Boston: Brill. ISBN 9789004128408.
- Hoyos, Dexter (2005). Hannibal's Dynasty: Power and Politics in the Western Mediterranean, 247–183 BC. London: Routledge. ISBN 9780415359580.
- Lerner, Jeffrey (1999). The Impact of Seleucid Decline on the Eastern Iranian Plateau: The Foundations of Arsacid Parthia and Graeco-Bactria. Stuttgart: Franz Steiner Verlag. ISBN 9783515074179.
- Overtoom, Nikolaus Leo (2020). Reign of Arrows: The Rise of the Parthian Empire in the Hellenistic Middle East. Oxford: Oxford University Press. ISBN 9780190888329.
- Sarikakis, Theodoros (1974). "Το Βασίλειο των Σελευκιδών και η Ρώμη" [The Seleucid Kingdom and Rome]. In Christopoulos, Georgios A. & Bastias, Ioannis K. (eds.). Ιστορία του Ελληνικού Έθνους [History of the Greek Nation] (in Greek). Vol. Ε: Ελληνιστικοί Χρόνοι [Hellenistic Period]. Athens: Ekdotiki Athinon. pp. 55–91. ISBN 978-960-213-101-5.
- Sartre, Maurice (2006). Ελληνιστική Μικρασία: Aπο το Αιγαίο ως τον Καύκασο [Hellenistic Asia Minor: From the Aegean to the Caucaus] (in Greek). Athens: Patakis Editions. ISBN 9789601617565.
- Taylor, Michael (2013). Antiochus The Great. Barnsley: Pen and Sword Military. ISBN 9781848844636.
- Taylor, Michael."'A Commander Will Put an End to His Insolence': The Battle of Magnesia, 190 BCE." In Altay Coskun and Benjamin Scolnic (edd.) The Seleukids at War: Recruitment, Composition, and Organization, pp.269-296. Stuttgart, Franz Steiner Verlag: 2024.
