= Polyxenidas =

Rhodian admiral of Antiochus III

- Native name: Πολυξενίδας
- Born: c. 230 BC
- Died: c. 185 BC (aged c. 45)
- Allegiance: Seleucid Empire
- Service years: 209 - 190 BC
- Conflicts: Battle of Mount Labus; Roman–Seleucid War Battle of Corycus Battle of Myonessus

Polyxenidas (Ancient Greek: Πολυξενίδας) the Rhodian, was a general and admiral who was exiled from his native country and entered the service of Antiochus III the Great.

He is first mentioned in 209 BC, when he commanded a body of Cretan mercenaries for Antiochus III during the Battle of Mount Labus. In 192 BC, when the Syrian king had determined upon war with the Roman Republic, and crossed over into Greece to commence it, Polyxenidas obtained the chief command of his fleet. After co-operating with Menippus in the reduction of Chalcis, he was sent back to Asia to assemble additional forces during the winter.

We do not hear anything of his operations in the ensuing campaign in 191 BC, but when Antiochus III, after his defeat at the Fourth Battle of Thermopylae, withdrew to Asia, Polyxenidas was again appointed to command the king's main fleet on the Ionian coast. Having learnt that the praetor Gaius Livius Salinator had arrived at Delos with the Roman fleet, he strongly urged upon the king the expediency of giving him battle without delay, before he could unite his fleet with those of Eumenes II and the Rhodians. Though his advice was followed, it was too late to prevent the junction of Eumenes with Livius, but Polyxenidas fought their combined fleets at the Battle of Corycus. The superiority of numbers, however, decided the victory in favour of the allies; thirteen ships of the Syrian fleet were taken and ten sunk, while Polyxenidas himself, with the remainder, took refuge in the port of Ephesus.

Here he spent the winter in active preparations for a renewal of the contest; and early in the next spring of 190 BC, having learnt that Pausistratus, with the Rhodian fleet, had already put to sea, he conceived the idea of surprising him before he could unite his forces with those of Livius. For this purpose he pretended to enter into negotiations with him for the betrayal into his hands of the Syrian fleet, and having by this means deluded him into a fancied security, suddenly attacked him, and destroyed almost his whole fleet. After this success he sailed to Samos to give battle to the fleet of the Roman admiral and Eumenes, but a storm prevented the engagement, and Polyxenidas withdrew to Ephesus. Soon after, Livius, having been reinforced by a fresh squadron of twenty Rhodian ships under Eudamus, proceeded in his turn to offer battle to Polyxenidas, but this the latter now declined. Lucius Aemilius Regillus, who soon after succeeded Livius in the command of the Roman fleet, also attempted without effect to draw Polyxenidas forth from the port of Ephesus. However, at a later period in the season, when Eumenes, with his fleet, had been detached to the Hellespont and a considerable part of the Rhodian forces were detained in Lycia, the Syrian admiral seized the opportunity and sallied out to attack the Roman fleet. The ensuing Battle of Myonessus near Teos terminated in the total defeat of Polyxenidas, who lost 42 of his ships, and made a hasty retreat with the remainder to Ephesus.

Here he remained until he received the tidings of the fatal Battle of Magnesia, on which he sailed to Patara in Lycia, and from thence proceeded by land to join Antiochus in Syria. After this, he is not mentioned again.
