= Erythras (Ionia) =

Port town of ancient Ionia

Coordinates: 38°10′02″N 26°30′50″E

Erythras (Ancient Greek: Ἐρυθρᾶς) was a port town of ancient Ionia, near Erythrae. Strabo, whose description proceeds from south to north, after describing Teos, says, "before you come to Erythrae, first is Erae, a small city of the Teians, then Corycus, a lofty mountain, and a harbour under it, Casystes; and another harbour called Erythras."

Its site is tentatively located near the modern Sarpdere Limanı, Asiatic Turkey.
