= Rhodountia =

Rhodountia (Ancient Greek: Ῥοδουντία) was a fortified place at Phthiotis, Central Greece, possibly near today's Drakospilia.

It is mentioned by Strabo, Livy and Stephanus of Byzantium.

During the Battle of Thermopylae (191 BC), the Aetolians defended it against the Romans. The Roman troops under the command of Lucius Valerius Flaccus were not able to capture it.
