= Casystes =

Port town of ancient Ionia

Coordinates: 38°08′54″N 26°33′25″E

Casystes or Kasystes (Ancient Greek: Κασύστης) was a port town of ancient Ionia, near Erythrae. Strabo, whose description proceeds from south to north, after describing Teos, says, "before you come to Erythrae, first is Erae, a small city of the Teians, then Corycus, a lofty mountain, and a harbour under it, Casystes; and another harbour called Erythras." It is probably the Cyssus of Livy, the port to which the fleet of Antiochus III sailed (191 BCE) before the naval engagement in which the king was defeated by Eumenes II and the Romans.

Its site is tentatively located near the modern Kırkdilim Limanı, İzmir Province, Turkey.
