= Battle of the Eurymedon (190 BC) =

Naval battle where Rhodes defeat the Seleucids

Coordinates: 36.4600°N 31.2320°E

- Part of the Roman–Seleucid war
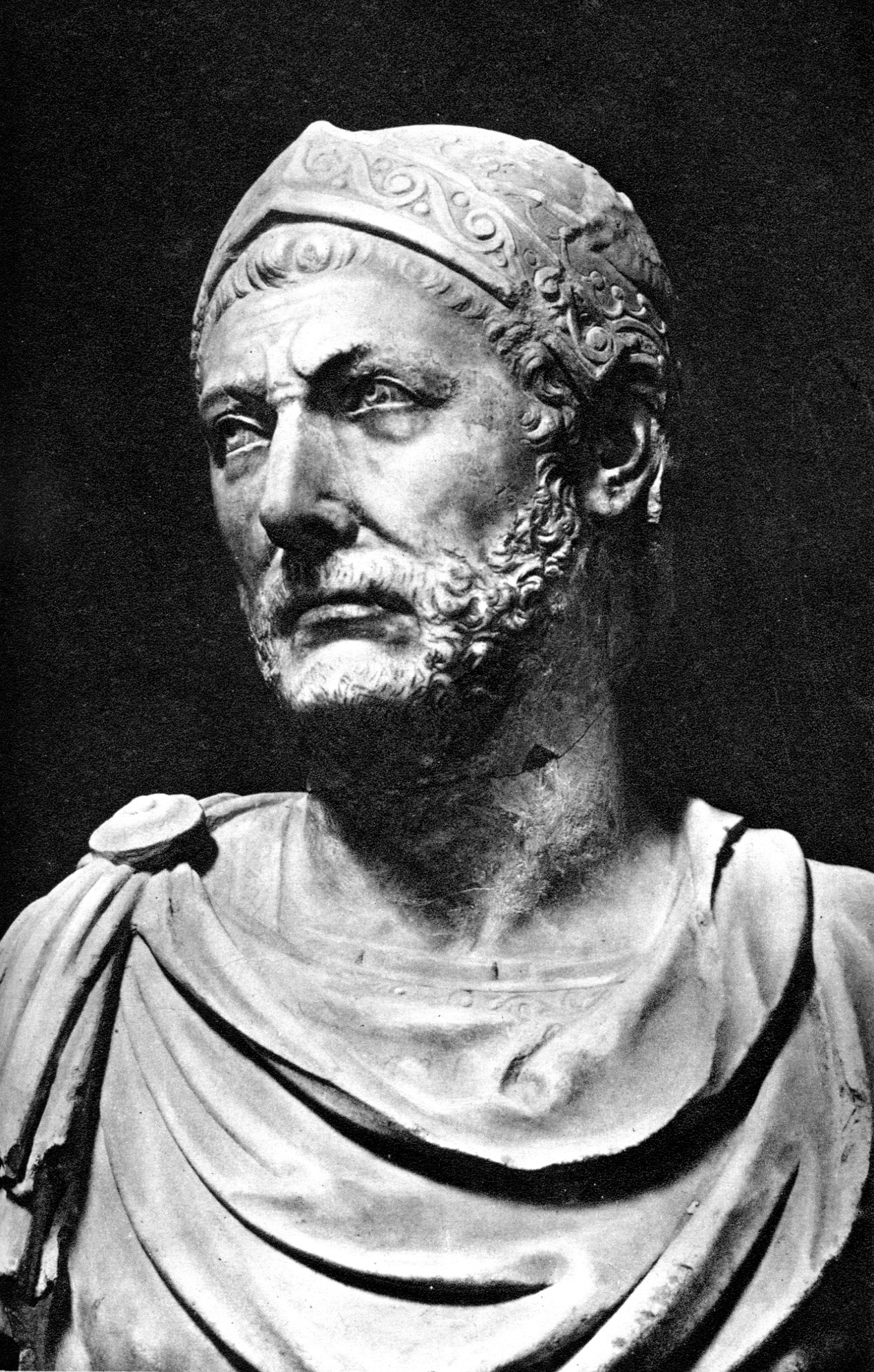
- A marble bust, reputedly of Hannibal
Date	August 190 BC
Location	Off Side (modern day Antalya-Turkey)
Result	Rhodian victory

Belligerents
Rhodes	Seleucid Empire

Commanders and leaders
Eudamus; Pamphilidas; Charikleitos	Hannibal; Apollonius

Strength
38 ships	47 ships

Casualties and losses
10 ships damaged	1 ship seized 20 ships damaged
- Approximate location of the Battle of Eurymedon

The Battle of the Eurymedon, also known as the Battle of Side took place in August 190 BC. It was fought as part of the Roman–Seleucid War, pitting the fleets of Rhodes under admiral Eudamus against a Seleucid fleet of Hannibal.

The battle took place off Side, when Hannibal attacked the Rhodian fleet docked in the mouth of Eurymedon River. After overcoming some initial confusion, the Rhodians executed the diekplous maneuver against the Seleucid seaward wing. Half of the Seleucid ships were heavily damaged, forcing them to withdraw. While Hannibal managed to preserve most of his fleet, he was unable to reinforce the rest of the Seleucid navy in Ephesus which left it isolated and vulnerable. This allowed the Romans to proceed with their invasion of Seleucid Asia Minor.

== Background ==
Following his return from his Bactrian (210–209 BC) and Indian (206–205 BC) campaigns, the Seleucid King Antiochus III the Great forged an alliance with Philip V of Macedon, seeking to jointly conquer the territories of the Ptolemaic Kingdom. In 198, Antiochus emerged victorious in the Fifth Syrian War, taking over Coele-Syria and securing his south-eastern border. He then focused his attention on Asia Minor, launching a successful campaign against coastal Ptolemaic possessions. In 196, Antiochus used the opportunity of Attalus I's death to assault cities controlled by the Attalid dynasty. Fearing that Antiochus would seize the entirety of Asia Minor, the independent cities Smyrna and Lampsacus decided to appeal for protection from the Roman Republic. In the early spring of 196, Antiochus' troops crossed to the European side of the Hellespont and began rebuilding the strategically important city of Lysimachia. In October 196, Antiochus met with a delegation of Roman diplomats in Lysimachia. The Romans demanded that Antiochus withdraw from Europe and restore the autonomous status of Greek city states in Asia Minor. Antiochus countered by claiming that he was simply rebuilding the empire of his ancestor Antiochus II Theos and criticized the Romans for meddling in the affairs of Asia Minor states, whose rights were traditionally defended by Rhodes.

In late winter 196/195, Rome's erstwhile chief enemy, Carthaginian general Hannibal, fled from Carthage to Antiochus' court in Ephesus. Despite the emergence of pro-war party led by Scipio Africanus, the Roman Senate exercised restraint. The Seleucids expanded their holdings in Thrace from Perinthus to Maroneia at the expense of Thracian tribesmen. Negotiations between the Romans and the Seleucids resumed, coming to a standstill once again, over differences between Greek and Roman law on the status of disputed territorial possessions. In the summer of 193, a representative of the Aetolian League assured Antiochus that the Aetolians would take his side in a future war with Rome, while Antiochus gave tacit support to Hannibal's plans of launching an anti-Roman coup d'état in Carthage. The Aetolians began spurring Greek states to jointly revolt under Antiochus' leadership against the Romans, hoping to provoke a war between the two parties. The Aetolians then captured the strategically important port city of Demetrias, killing the key members of the local pro-Roman faction. In September 192, Aetolian general Thoantas arrived at Antiochus' court, convincing him to openly oppose the Romans in Greece. The Seleucids selected 10,000 infantry, 500 cavalry, 6 war elephants and 300 ships to be transferred for their campaign in Greece.

== Prelude ==
The Seleucid fleet sailed via Imbros and Skiathos, arriving at Demetrias where Antiochus' army disembarked. The Achaean League declared war on the Seleucids and Aetolians, with the Romans following suit in November 192. Between December 192 and March 191, Antiochus campaigned in Thessaly and Acarnania. A combined counter offensive conducted by the Romans and their Macedonian allies erased all of Antiochus' gains in Thessaly within a month. On 26 April 191, the two sides faced off at the Battle of Thermopylae, Antiochus' army suffered a devastating defeat and he returned to Ephesus shortly afterwards.

The Romans intended to invade the Seleucid base of operations in Asia Minor which could only be done by crossing the Aegean Sea, the Hellespont being the preferable option due to logistical concerns. Antiochus saw his fleet as disposable, believing that he could still rout the Romans on land. His adversaries on the other hand, could not afford a major defeat at sea, since the manpower to commandeer a new fleet would not be available for months; all while the Roman infantry would struggle to sustain itself, while remaining grounded in mainland Greece. Both sides began hastily reequipping their navies, constructing new warships and drafting seamen. A Roman naval force under Gaius Livius Salinator consisting of 81 ships arrived at the Piraeus too late to impact the campaign in mainland Greece. It was therefore dispatched to the Thracian coast, where it was to unite with the navies of the Rhodians and the Attalids. The Seleucids attempted to intercept the Roman fleet before this could be achieved. In September 191, the Roman fleet defeated the Seleucids in the Battle of Corycus, enabling it to take control of several cities including Dardanus and Sestos on the Hellespont.

Following the Battle of Corycus, the Roman–Pergamene fleet at Canae was made up of 77 Roman and 50 Pergamene ships, half of the latter being apertae (merchant galleys capable of fighting). The main Seleucid fleet under admiral Polyxenidas consisted of 23 large ships, 47 triremes and approximately 100 apertae and was stationed at Ephesus, Hannibal had amassed a second fleet in Cilicia. Separating the two Seleucid fleets was the Rhodian navy which numbered 75 large ships, mainly quadriremes. In spring 190, a Rhodian squadron united with the Roman fleet off Samos, where Roman admiral Lucius Aemilius Regillus took overall command. When the Rhodians raised concerns about the threat of the Seleucid Cilician fleet, Aemilius assembled a mixed squadron with the intention of seizing Patara, a key Seleucid naval base in the region. The amphibious attack on Patara was repelled by the city's garrison. During the course of 190, Hannibal focused his attention on building the Cilician fleet from scratch, his first major military command after spending five years in the Seleucid court. Hannibal believed that the Romans would continue using boarding tactics and therefore focused on purchasing large, multi-oared vessels. Although Phoenician territories like Tyre and Sidon possessed the necessary combination of raw materials, technical expertise and experienced personnel, it took much longer than expected for the fleet to be completed. The delay was most likely due to wartime shortages.

== Battle ==
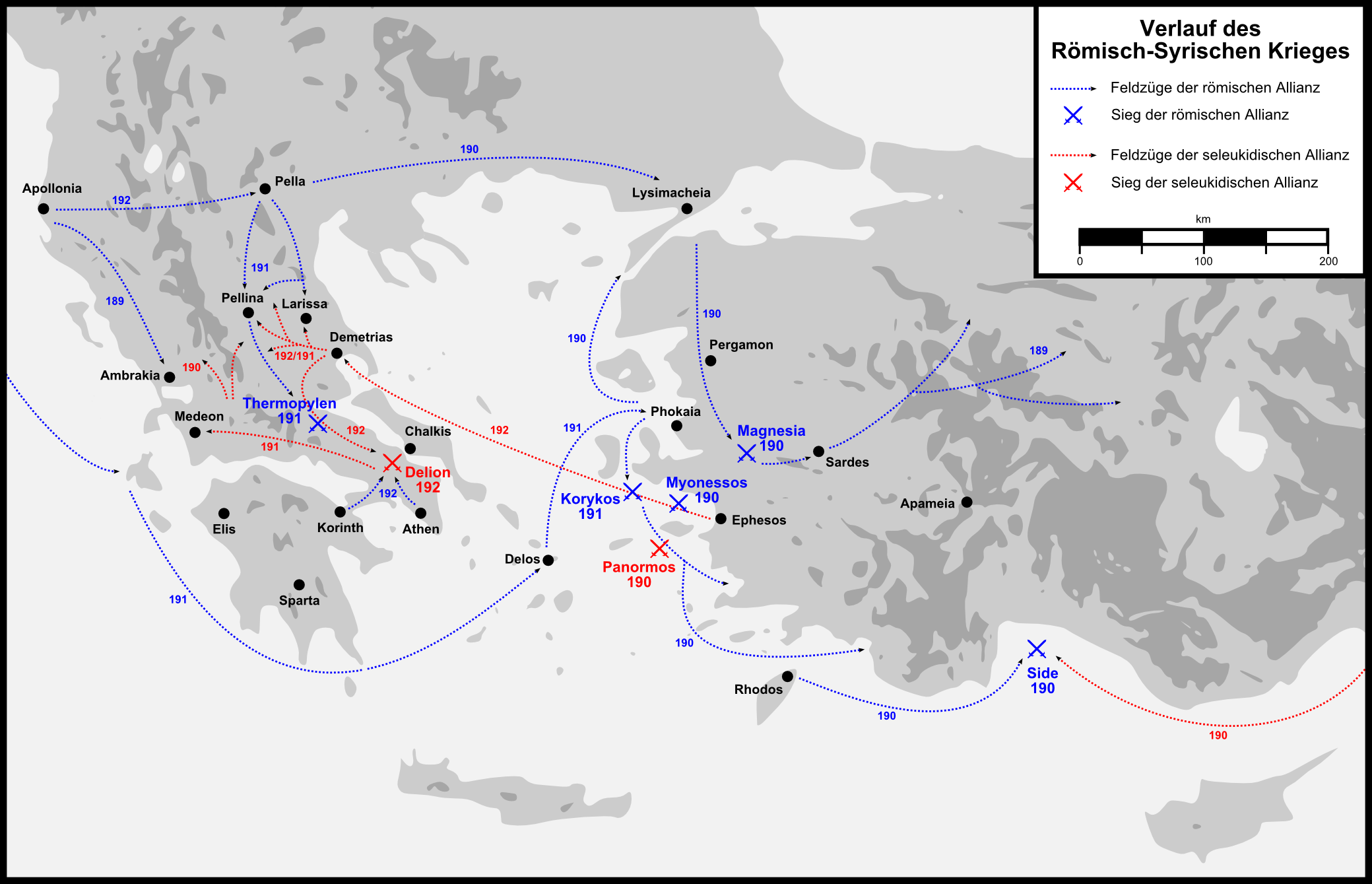
The course of the war, with locations of key battles

In July 190, Hannibal ordered his fleet of three septiremes, four hexaremes, 30 quinqueremes and 10 triremes to set sail from Seleucia Pieria along the southern Asia Minor coast. The fleet's advance was hampered by contrary winds and the need for additional training maneuvers. Upon being informed of Hannibal's advance to the west, Rhodian admiral Eudamus gathered a squadron of 13 warships at Samos. Eudamus picked up individual warships on his way south until he was reinforced by a second Rhodian squadron commanded by Pamphilidas off Megiste, their fleet now numbering 32 quadriremes, 2 quinqueremes and 4 triremes. The Rhodians then sailed to Phaselis, a location of strategic importance which would enable them to block any fleet trying to attack their kingdom from Lycia. In August, after a number of Rhodian sailors caught a disease which spread from the local inhabitants, Eudamus moved his fleet to the mouth of Eurymedon River. There he was informed by citizens of Aspendos that Hannibal's fleet was at Side. Hannibal was likewise aware of the Rhodian fleet's whereabouts from his own lookouts.

Hannibal's fleet assumed battle formation first, with Hannibal leading the seaward wing while Seleucid nobleman Apollonius commanded the landward wing. Eudamus commanded the Rhodian seaward wing, Pamphilidas led the center and Charikleitos commanded the landward wing. Confusion among the Rhodians resulted in 6 ships belonging to the seaward wing briefly facing half of Hannibal's force. The more experienced Rhodians managed to quickly maneuver the 6 ships to the right, enabling the rest of the fleet to engage. The faster Rhodian ships struck the Seleucid landward wing through the diekplous maneuver. This tactic involved rowing through gaps between the Seleucid ships and then attacking their vulnerable sides and sterns. Most of Apollonius' ships were heavily damaged, forcing him to retreat, while the Rhodians turned to assist Eudamus whose squadron was slowly losing to that of Hannibal. Hannibal used the opportunity to withdraw, evading the enemy ships sent to pursue him. One Seleucid septireme was captured and 20 other ships were seriously damaged. Ten Rhodian ships were also damaged.

== Aftermath ==
Hannibal had preserved most of his fleet, however he was in no position to unite with Polyxenidas' fleet at Ephesus since his ships required lengthy repairs. Polyxenidas thus found himself isolated, as he was unable to face the Romans at sea without significant reinforcements. The Rhodians withdrew to Rhodes for repairs, leaving Charikleitos with 20 ships at Megiste. In September, when Aemilius dispatched a part of his fleet to the Hellespont in order to assist the Roman army in its invasion of Asia Minor, Polyxenidas seized the opportunity to attack the Romans at sea. The ensuing Battle of Myonessus resulted in a decisive Roman-Rhodian victory, which solidified Roman control over the Aegean Sea, enabling them to launch an invasion of Seleucid Asia Minor. Antiochus withdrew his armies from Thrace, while simultaneously offering to cover half of the Roman war expenses and accept the demands made in Lysimachia in 196. Yet the Romans were determined to crush the Seleucids once and for all. As the Roman forces reached Maroneia, Antiochus began preparing for a final decisive battle.

== Sources ==
- Graigner, John (2002). The Roman War of Antiochus the Great. Boston: Brill. ISBN 9789004128408.
- Lazenby, John (1987). "The Diekplous". Greece & Rome. 34 (2): 169–177. doi:10.1017/S0017383500028114. JSTOR 642944.
- Lerner, Jeffrey (1999). The Impact of Seleucid Decline on the Eastern Iranian Plateau: The Foundations of Arsacid Parthia and Graeco-Bactria. Stuttgart: Franz Steiner Verlag. ISBN 9783515074179.
- Overtoom, Nikolaus Leo (2020). Reign of Arrows: The Rise of the Parthian Empire in the Hellenistic Middle East. Oxford: Oxford University Press. ISBN 9780190888329.
- Sarikakis, Theodoros (1974). "Το Βασίλειο των Σελευκιδών και η Ρώμη" [The Seleucid Kingdom and Rome]. In Christopoulos, Georgios A. & Bastias, Ioannis K. (eds.). Ιστορία του Ελληνικού Έθνους [History of the Greek Nation] (in Greek). Vol. Ε: Ελληνιστικοί Χρόνοι [Hellenistic Period]. Athens: Ekdotiki Athinon. pp. 55–91. ISBN 978-960-213-101-5.
- Sartre, Maurice (2006). Ελληνιστική Μικρασία: Aπο το Αιγαίο ως τον Καύκασο [Hellenistic Asia Minor: From the Aegean to the Caucaus] (in Greek). Athens: Patakis Editions. ISBN 9789601617565.
- Taylor, Michael (2013). Antiochus The Great. Barnsley: Pen and Sword Military. ISBN 9781848844636.
