= Corycus (Ionia) =

Corycus or Korykos (Ancient Greek: Κώρυκος) was a town in ancient Ionia, near a mountain of the same name. It was found near the coast and is cited by Thucydides, who says that Corycus was in the territory of Erythrae. Thucydides writes that Corycus was the place where, during the Peloponnesian War, in the year 412 BCE, Alcibiades and Chalcideus released their prisoners and conspired to cause the defection of Chios from the Delian League. Later, the Spartan Astyochus was also in Corycus when he went to Miletus to take command of the fleet. It was once inhabited by a piratical people, called Corycaei, who carried on their trade in a systematic manner, by keeping spies in the various ports, to find out what the traders had in their ships, and where they were bound to, and so attacked them on the sea and robbed them. Hence came the proverb which Strabo mentions. Stephanus of Byzantium, who quotes the Asia of Hecataeus, and cites the passage of Strabo, reiterates that the town was in the territory of Erythrae. In 191 BC it was the site of the Battle of Corycus.

Its site is unlocated, although William Smith would equate it with the town of Casystes
