= Battle of Corycus =

191 BC naval battle of the Roman-Seleucid War

- Part of the Roman–Seleucid War
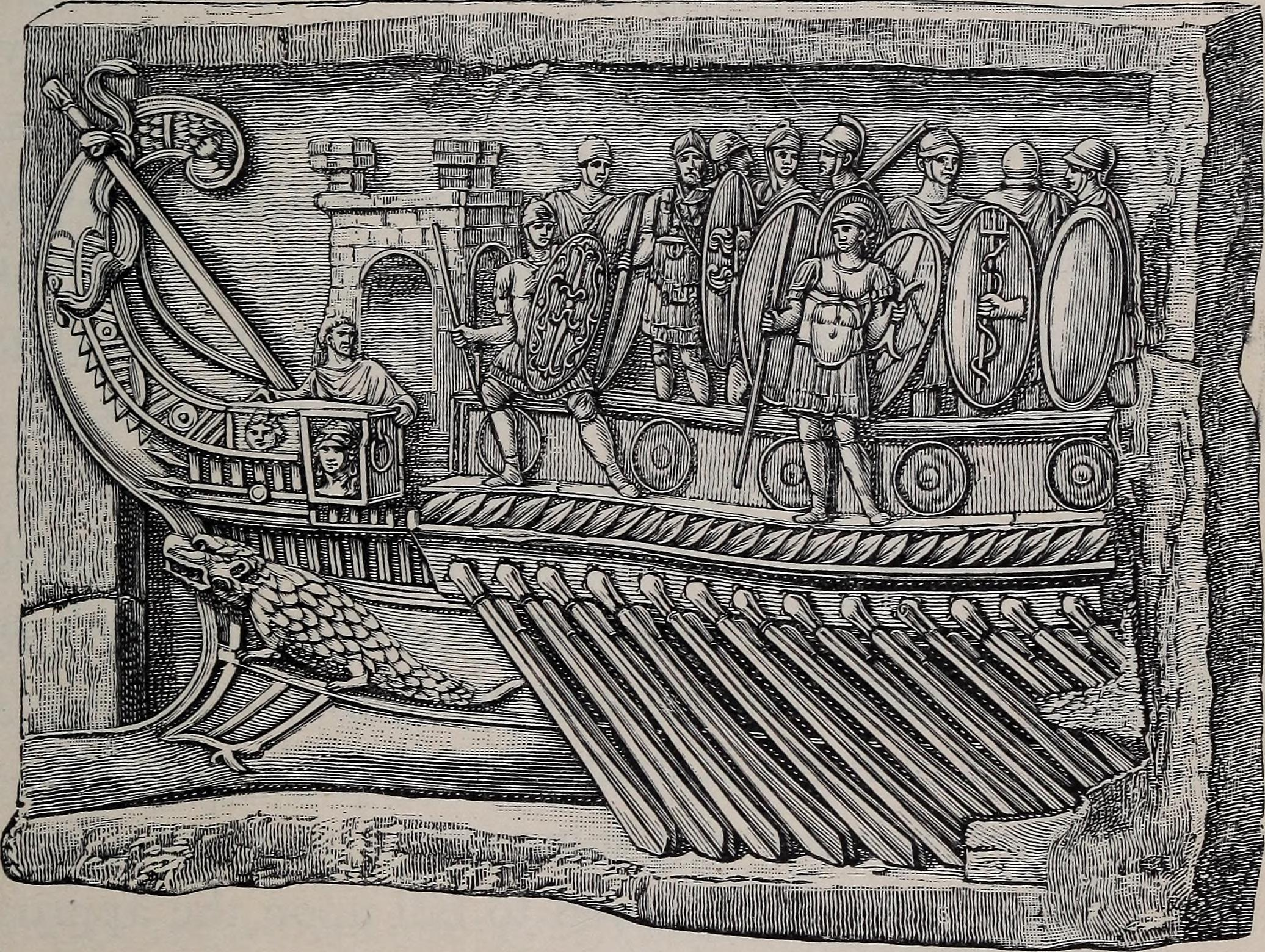
- Relief depicting a Roman warship
Date	September 191 BC
Location	Off Corycus, Ionia (modern-day Turkey) 38°06′N 26°36′E
Result	Roman–Pergamene victory

Belligerents
Roman Republic; Pergamon; Carthage	Seleucid Empire

Commanders and leaders
Gaius Livius Salinator; Eumenes II	Polyxenidas

Strength
81 Roman quinqueremes 24 Roman apertae 24 Pergamene triremes 26 Pergamene apertae	70 decked tectae 100-130 apertae

Casualties and losses
1 ship seized	13 ships seized 10 ships sunk
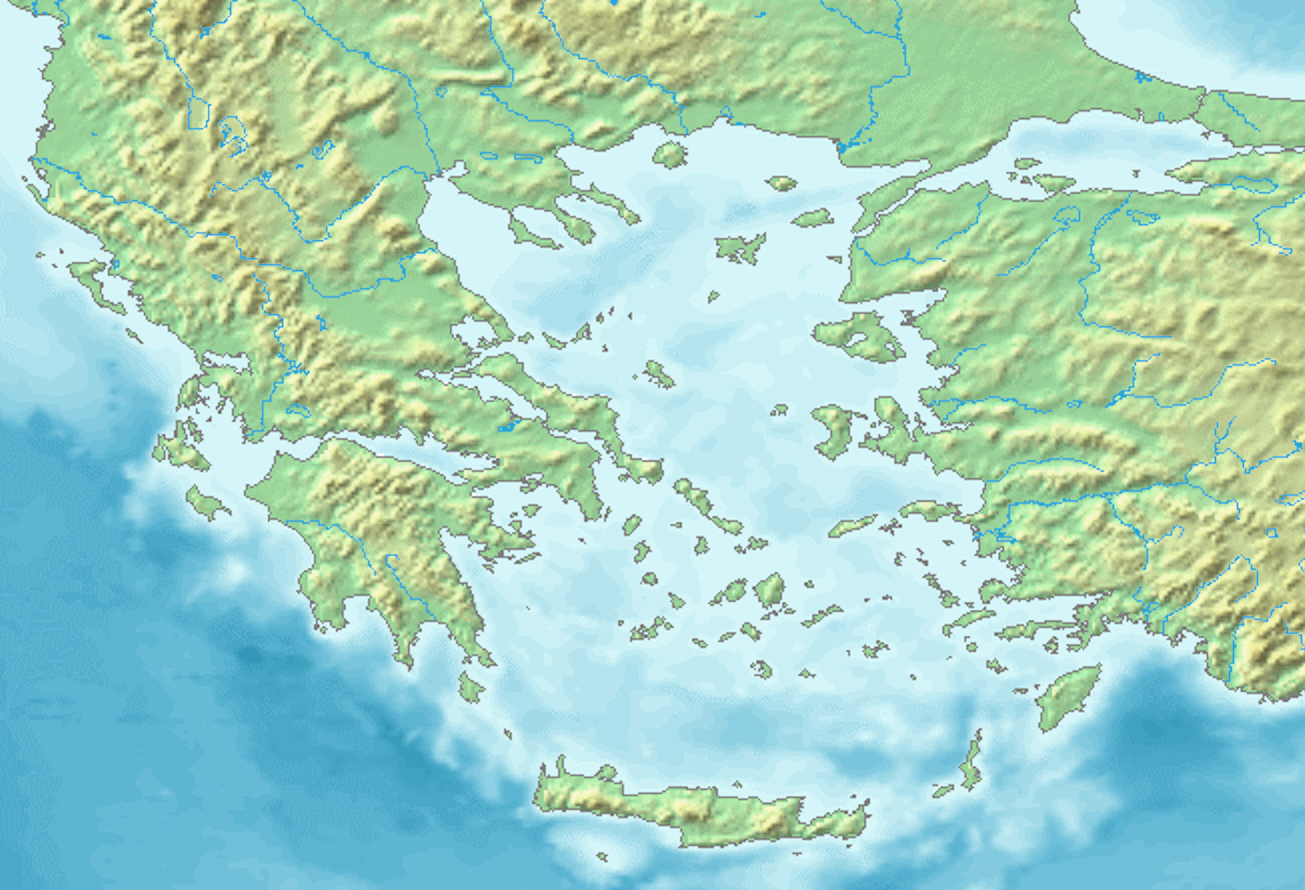
- Location within Aegean Sea

The Battle of Corycus, also known as the Battle of Kissos, took place in September 191 BC. It was fought as part of the Roman–Seleucid War, pitting the fleets of the Roman Republic led by Admiral Gaius Livius Salinator and its Pergamene allies under Eumenes II against a Seleucid fleet of Polyxenidas.

The battle began when Polyxenidas attacked the allied fleet off Corycus. The Roman squadron maneuvered seaward, negating the initial numerical advantage the Seleucids possessed. The allies then used grappling hooks to board the Seleucid ships and overwhelm their smaller crews with marine infantry. Polyxenidas ordered a withdrawal after losing 23 warships. The victory at Corycus enabled the allies to blockade the remnants of the Seleucid fleet in the port of Ephesus.

== Background ==
Following his return from his Bactrian (210–209 BC) and Indian (206–205 BC) campaigns, the Seleucid king, Antiochus III the Great, forged an alliance with Philip V of Macedon, seeking to jointly conquer the territories of the Ptolemaic Kingdom. In 198 BC, Antiochus emerged victorious in the Fifth Syrian War, taking over Coele-Syria and securing his south-eastern border. He then focused his attention on Asia Minor, launching a successful campaign against coastal Ptolemaic possessions. In 196 BC, Antiochus used the opportunity of Attalus I's death to assault cities controlled by the Attalid dynasty. Fearing that Antiochus would seize the entirety of Asia Minor, the independent cities Smyrna and Lampsacus decided to appeal for protection from the Roman Republic. In the early spring of 196 BC, Antiochus' troops crossed to the European side of the Hellespont and began rebuilding the strategically important city of Lysimachia. In October 196 BC, Antiochus met with a delegation of Roman diplomats in Lysimachia. The Romans demanded that Antiochus withdraw from Europe and restore the autonomous status of Greek city states in Asia Minor. Antiochus countered by claiming that he was simply rebuilding the empire of his ancestor, Antiochus II Theos, and criticized the Romans for meddling in the affairs of Asia Minor states, whose rights were traditionally defended by Rhodes.

In late winter of 196/195 BC, Rome's erstwhile chief enemy, Carthaginian general Hannibal, fled from Carthage to Antiochus' court in Ephesus after his homeland became a Roman client state. Despite the emergence of pro-war party led by Scipio Africanus, the Roman Senate exercised restraint. The Seleucids expanded their holdings in Thrace from Perinthus to Maroneia at the expense of Thracian tribesmen. Negotiations between the Romans and the Seleucids resumed, coming to a standstill once again, over differences between Greek and Roman law on the status of disputed territorial possessions. In the summer of 193 BC, a representative of the Aetolian League assured Antiochus that the Aetolians would take his side in a future war with Rome, while Antiochus gave tacit support to Hannibal's plans of launching an anti-Roman coup d'état in Carthage. The Aetolians began spurring Greek states to jointly revolt under Antiochus' leadership against the Romans, hoping to provoke a war between the two parties. The Aetolians then captured the strategically important port city of Demetrias, killing the key members of the local pro-Roman faction. In September 192 BC, Aetolian general Thoantas arrived at Antiochus' court, convincing him to openly oppose the Romans in Greece. The Seleucids selected 10,000 infantry, 500 cavalry, six war elephants and 300 ships to be transferred for their campaign in Greece.

== Prelude ==
The Seleucid fleet sailed via Imbros and Skiathos, arriving at Demetrias where Antiochus' army disembarked. The Achaean League declared war on the Seleucids and Aetolians, with the Romans following suit in November 192 BC. Between December 192 and March 191 BC, Antiochus campaigned in Thessaly and Acarnania. A combined counter offensive conducted by the Romans and their Macedonian allies erased all of Antiochus' gains in Thessaly within a month. On 26 April 191 BC, the two sides faced off at the Battle of Thermopylae, Antiochus' army suffered a devastating defeat and he returned to Ephesus shortly afterwards. Following the Seleucid defeat at Thermopylae, the maritime power of Rhodes decided to side with their erstwhile allies the Romans.

The Romans intended to invade the Seleucid base of operations in Asia Minor which could only be done by crossing the Aegean Sea, the Hellespont being the preferable option due to logistical concerns. Antiochus saw his fleet as disposable, believing that he can still rout the Romans on land. His adversaries on the other hand, could not afford a major defeat at sea, since the manpower to commandeer a new fleet would not be available for months. All while the Roman infantry would struggle to sustain itself, while remaining grounded in mainland Greece. A Roman naval force under Gaius Livius Salinator consisting of 81 ships arrived at Piraeus too late to impact the campaign in mainland Greece. It was therefore dispatched to the Thracian coast, where it was to unite with the navies of the Rhodians and the Attalids. After returning to Ephesus, Antiochus transferred most of his navy to the Hellespont, simultaneously ordering Admiral Polyxenidas to build a new fleet for the protection of the Asia Minor coastline.

When Polyxenidas was informed that the Roman fleet had reached Delos, less than a day's sail from Ephesus he requested Antiochus to return with the fleet to the capital. Livius' force lingered at Delos for approximately three weeks. According to Livy’s Ab Urbe Condita Libri the Romans were confined to the harbor by Etesian winds; British historian John Graigner on the other hand argued that Livius and Pergamene King Eumenes II who accompanied him were busy establishing diplomatic and military contacts. Antiochus was thus able to lead the Seleucid navy from Lysimachia back to Ephesus.

== Battle ==
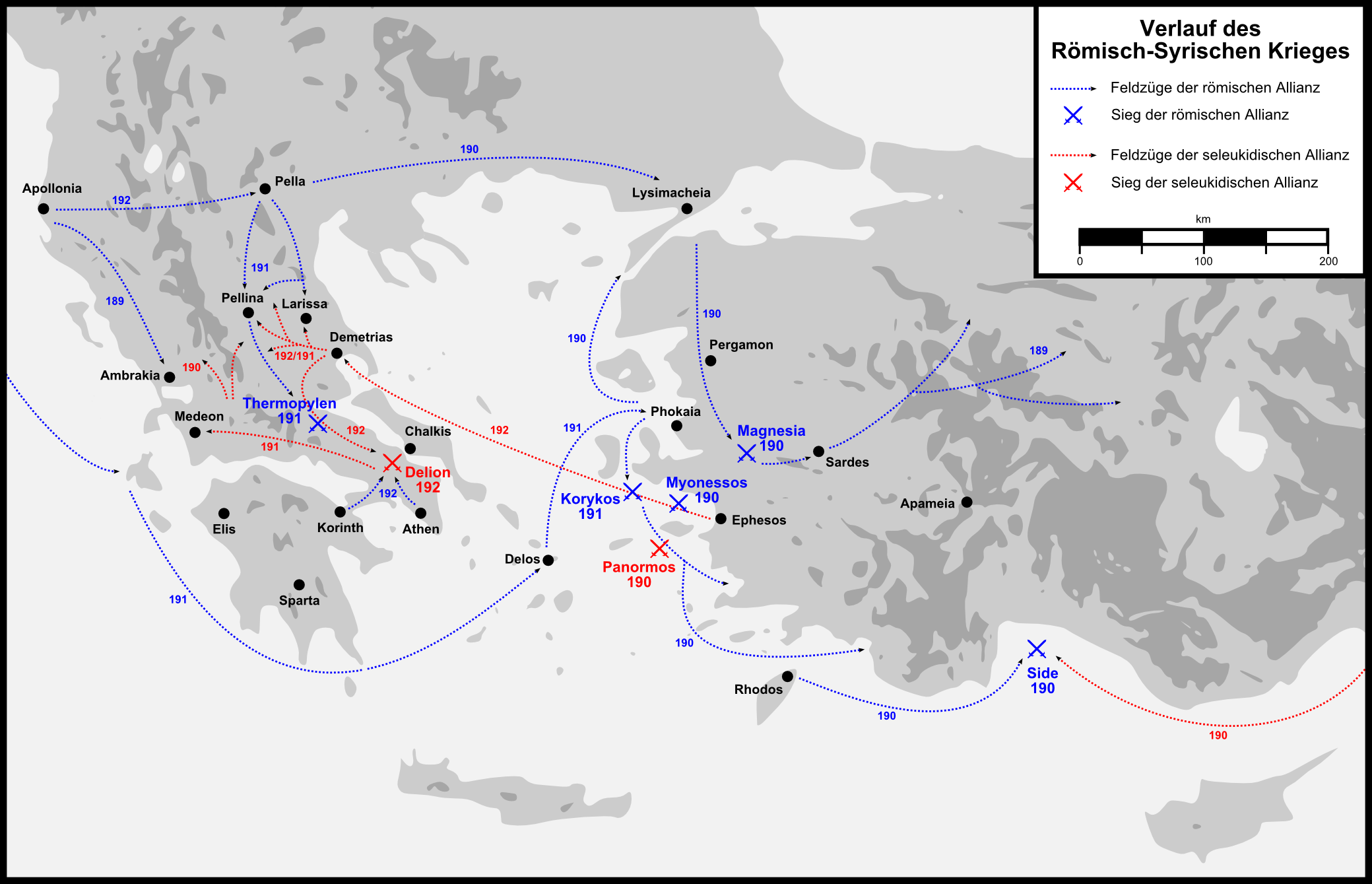
The course of the war, with locations of key battles

In September 191 BC, Antiochus entrusted Polyxenidas with a fleet of 70 decked tectae and 100 to 130 apertae, which were merchant galleys capable of fighting. The Seleucids sailed from Ephesus north to Phocaea positioning themselves between the Pergamene naval base at Elaea and Delos. At Delos the Romans had 81 quinqueremes and 24 apertae, while the Pergamenes had three warships. The allied fleet sailed to Phanai in southern Chios and from there to its main harbor to obtain supplies, while the Rhodians had just reached Samos. At Phocaea, Polyxenidas recognized the risk of the allies could first unite with the Rhodian navy as well as the fact one could reach Elaea undetected from the side of Lesbos. He thus took his forces to the Kissos harbor south west of Corycus, where he could intercept the allied fleet in either direction. The Chiots provided Livius with intelligence on Seleucid maneuvers, enabling the allies to safely sail to Phocaea where they were reinforced by the Pergamene navy, bringing the total of Pergamene ships to 24 triremes and 26 apertae.

The allied fleet then traveled south to Corycus in order to link up with the Rhodian squadron at Samos. After sighting the allied fleet, the Seleucids assumed battle formation and blocked its advance as it sailed along the coast. While the Seleucid navy possessed fewer large decked warships, Polyxenidas believed that it still possessed an advantage over their adversaries since the allied fleet was split into two groups; the Pergamene squadron sailing behind the Roman one. The Seleucids quickly captured one Carthaginian ship sailing in the front of the allied navy and chased another one away. Livius quickly steered the Roman squadron seaward, so as to delay the engagement until the Pergamene force could join it. This maneuver foiled Polyxenidas' plans as his numerical superiority evaporated. When the battle lines closed, the Romans used grappling hooks to board the Seleucid ships and overwhelm their smaller crews with marine infantry. A Roman squadron on the allied right wing also turned landward to strike the Seleucid seaward flank. While the Seleucid landward flank held off the Pergamenes, Polyxenidas ordered a withdrawal; believing that the battle was lost.

The allies did not engage in a pursuit since their warships were loaded with supplies, allowing the Seleucids to slip into Ephesus. The following day, Livius' force united with a squadron of 25 heavy Rhodian warships under Admiral Pausistratos. The allies sailed outside Ephesus in a show of force before dispersing. Ten Seleucid ships were sunk and 13 were captured along with their crews. The allies lost a single Carthaginian ship captured.

== Aftermath ==
In the aftermath of the battle the Pergamenes and Rhodians returned to their bases in preparation for the winter. The Romans likewise departed for their winter camp at Canae, leaving four quinqueremes to guard Phocaea. Polyxenidas sent the Rhodians a series of letters, feigning his intention to desert in order to gain time to reorganize his fleet. In 190 BC, Antiochus ordered Hannibal to build a new fleet in Cilicia, his first major military command after spending five years in the Seleucid court. The outcome of the battle of Corycus directly impacted Seleucid preparations. Hannibal believed that the Romans would continue using boarding tactics and thus focused on purchasing large, multi-oared vessels. Following the Battle of Corycus, the Roman–Pergamene fleet at Canae was made up of 77 Roman and 50 Pergamene ships, half of the latter being apertae (merchant galleys capable of fighting). The main Seleucid fleet under Admiral Polyxenidas consisted of 23 large ships, 47 triremes and approximately 100 apertae and was stationed at Ephesus.

In spring 190 BC, the Rhodians dispatched 36 ships under Pausistratos to reinforce the Romans. The Rhodians were blockaded by Polyxenidas at Parormos harbor, Samos. Polyxenidas destroyed the Rhodian fleet through perfidy. A Rhodian exile himself, he convinced Pausistratos that he intended to surrender the Seleucid fleet to the Rhodians. Polyxenidas killed the Rhodian Admiral, his erstwhile political opponent, while also capturing 20 ships and sinking nine. The Roman fleet nevertheless managed to unite with 20 Rhodian ships off Samos, where Roman Admiral Lucius Aemilius Regillus took overall command. In August 190 BC, a Rhodian fleet under Admiral Eudamus clashed with Hannibal's fleet at the Battle of the Eurymedon. The Rhodians managed to strike the vulnerable sides and sterns of the Seleucids through the diekplous maneuver, damaging half of his fleet. Polyxenidas now found himself outnumbered and isolated, as many independent Asia Minor states had sided with the Romans.

== Sources ==
- Graigner, John (2002). The Roman War of Antiochus the Great. Boston: Brill. doi:10.1163/9789004350861. ISBN 9789004128408.
- Lerner, Jeffrey (1999). The Impact of Seleucid Decline on the Eastern Iranian Plateau: The Foundations of Arsacid Parthia and Graeco-Bactria. Stuttgart: Franz Steiner Verlag. ISBN 9783515074179.
- Overtoom, Nikolaus Leo (2020). Reign of Arrows: The Rise of the Parthian Empire in the Hellenistic Middle East. Oxford: Oxford University Press. doi:10.1093/oso/9780190888329.001.0001. ISBN 9780190888329.
- Sarikakis, Theodoros (1974). "Το Βασίλειο των Σελευκιδών και η Ρώμη" [The Seleucid Kingdom and Rome]. In Christopoulos, Georgios A. & Bastias, Ioannis K. (eds.). Ιστορία του Ελληνικού Έθνους [History of the Greek Nation] (in Greek). Vol. Ε: Ελληνιστικοί Χρόνοι [Hellenistic Period]. Athens: Ekdotiki Athinon. pp. 55–91. ISBN 978-960-213-101-5.
- Sartre, Maurice (2006). Ελληνιστική Μικρασία: Aπο το Αιγαίο ως τον Καύκασο [Hellenistic Asia Minor: From the Aegean to the Caucaus] (in Greek). Athens: Patakis Editions. ISBN 9789601617565.
- Taylor, Michael (2013). Antiochus The Great. Barnsley: Pen and Sword Military. ISBN 9781848844636.
