= Pausistratus =

Pausistratus (Ancient Greek: Παυσίστρατος) was a native of Rhodes who was appointed commander of that state's forces in 197 BC. He was mentioned by Polybius (21.5 - 21.7.6), Livy (33.18, 36.45. 37.9 - 12), Polyaenus, (5.27) Appian (who refers to him by the name Pausimachus (Παυσίμαχος)) and Suda (which corrupted his name to Pasistrates, Πασιστράτης). He led a substantial army into the region of Asia Minor known as the Peraea, where he defeated the Macedonian general Deinocrates and brought the entire district under Rhodian control, though he failed to capture the city of Stratoniceia. Some years later, however, the city was ceded to the Rhodians by Antiochus.

During the war against Antiochus, Pausistratus was made commander of the Rhodian fleet in 191 BC, but he arrived too late to participate in the Roman victory over Polyxenidas. In the following year, 190 BC, he sailed early with a fleet of thirty-six ships. However, he was deceived by Polyxenidas, who feigned peace negotiations to lull him into a false sense of security before launching a sudden attack. The Rhodian fleet was almost completely destroyed or captured, and Pausistratus himself was killed while unsuccessfully trying to break through the enemy lines.
