= Battle of Thermopylae (191 BC) =

Battle of the Roman–Seleucid War

- Part of the Roman–Seleucid war
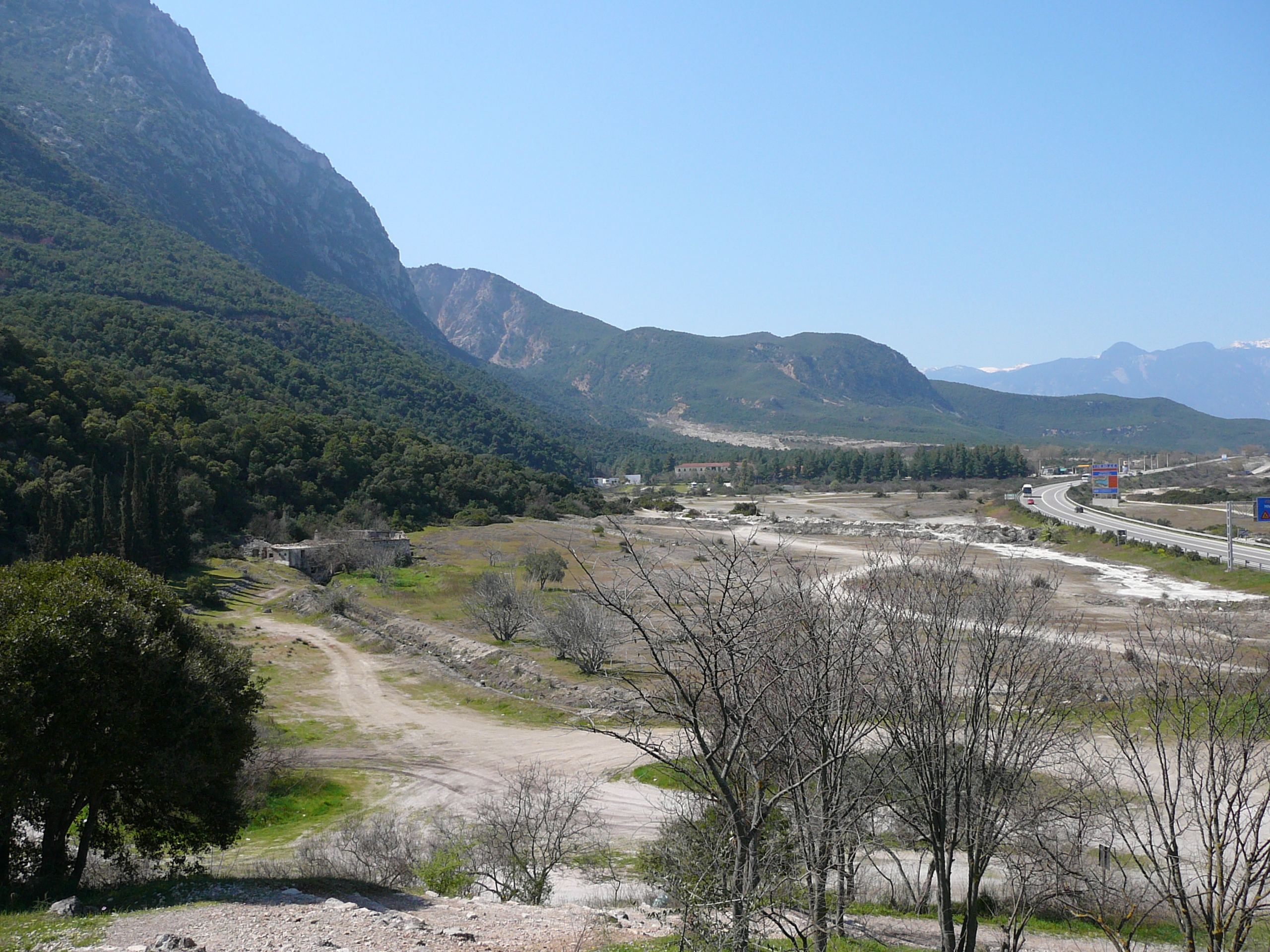
- View of the Thermopylae pass from the area of the Phocian Wall.
Date	24 April 191 BC
Location	Thermopylae, Greece 38.8000°N 22.5333°E
Result	Roman victory

Belligerents
Roman Republic	Seleucid Empire; Aetolian League

Commanders and leaders
Manius Acilius Glabrio; Marcus Porcius Cato; Lucius Valerius Flaccus	Antiochus III the Great

Strength
25,000 to 30,000; 15 war elephants	12,500 Seleucids; 16 war elephants 600 Aetolians

Casualties and losses
Unknown	12,000 killed 16 war elephants
- Location of the Battle of Thermopylae (191 BC)

The Battle of Thermopylae took place on 24 April 191 BC. It was fought as part of the Roman–Seleucid War, pitting forces of the Roman Republic led by the consul Manius Acilius Glabrio against a Seleucid-Aetolian army of Antiochus III the Great.

When the main bodies of the armies initially clashed at the Thermopylae pass, the Seleucids managed to hold their ground, repulsing multiple Roman assaults. However, a small Roman force under Marcus Porcius Cato managed to outflank the Seleucids from the hillside after surprising the Aetolian garrison of Fort Callidromus. The Seleucids panicked and broke ranks, leading to the destruction of their force. Antiochus managed to escape the battlefield with his cavalry, departing mainland Greece soon afterwards.

== Background ==
Following his return from his Bactrian (210–209 BC) and Indian (206–205 BC) campaigns, the Seleucid King Antiochus III the Great forged an alliance with Philip V of Macedon, seeking to jointly conquer the territories of the Ptolemaic Kingdom. In 198 BC, Antiochus emerged victorious in the Fifth Syrian War, taking over Coele-Syria and securing his south-eastern border. He then focused his attention on Asia Minor, launching a successful campaign against coastal Ptolemaic possessions. In 196 BC, Antiochus used the opportunity of Attalus I's death to assault cities controlled by the Attalid dynasty. Fearing that Antiochus would seize the entirety of Asia Minor, the independent cities Smyrna and Lampsacus decided to appeal for protection from the Roman Republic. In the early spring of 196 BC, Antiochus' troops crossed to the European side of the Hellespont and began rebuilding the strategically important city of Lysimachia. In October 196 BC, Antiochus met with a delegation of Roman diplomats in Lysimachia. The Romans demanded that Antiochus withdraw from Europe and restore the autonomous status of Greek city states in Asia Minor. Antiochus countered by claiming that he was simply rebuilding the empire of his ancestor Antiochus II Theos and criticized the Romans for meddling in the affairs of Asia Minor states, whose rights were traditionally defended by Rhodes.

In late winter 196/195 BC, Rome's erstwhile chief enemy, Carthaginian general Hannibal, fled from Carthage to Antiochus' court in Ephesus. Despite the emergence of a pro-war party led by Scipio Africanus, the Roman Senate exercised restraint. Negotiations between the Romans and the Seleucids resumed, coming to a standstill once again, over differences between Greek and Roman law on the status of disputed territorial possessions. In the summer of 193 BC, a representative of the Aetolian League assured Antiochus that the Aetolians would take his side in a future war with Rome, while Antiochus gave tacit support to Hannibal's plans of launching an anti-Roman coup d'état in Carthage. The Aetolians began spurring Greek states to jointly revolt under Antiochus' leadership against the Romans, hoping to provoke a war between the two parties. The Aetolians then captured the strategically important port city of Demetrias, killing the key members of the local pro-Roman faction. In September 192 BC, Aetolian general Thoantas arrived at Antiochus' court, convincing him to openly oppose the Romans in Greece. The Seleucids selected 10,000 infantry, 500 cavalry, 6 war elephants and 300 ships to be transferred for their campaign in Greece.

== Prelude ==
The Seleucid fleet sailed via Imbros and Skiathos, arriving at Demetrias where Antiochus' army disembarked. Antiochus traveled to Lamia where he participated in the council of the Aetolians, who declared him their Strategos for a year. The Achaean League declared war on the Seleucids and Aetolians, with the Romans following suit in November 192 BC. Antiochus forced Chalcis to open its gates to him and raided a Roman camp at Delium, killing 250 soldiers. The surrender of the Chalcidians led the rest of Euboea to follow its example. The Seleucids transformed the city into their base of operations, effectively controlling the Greek eastern coast. Antiochus then shifted his attention towards rebuilding his alliance with Philip V of Macedon, which had been shattered after the latter was decisively defeated by the Romans at the 197 BC Battle of Cynoscephalae. Philip expected that the Romans would emerge victorious in the conflict and counted on territorial rewards as well as the writing off of war reparations that he owed; while the Seleucids could provide neither, so Antiochus' overtures were rejected and Philip aligned himself with the Romans. Antiochus likewise approached Athens, the Athamanians, the Boeotian League as well as city states in Acarnania and Epirus with offers of alliance. Despite the reassurances of the Aetolians, most of the Greek states remained neutral, fearing future reprisals. Only Elis, the Boeotian League and Amynander of Athamania declared their allegiance to Antiochus, the later being promised the Macedonian throne for his brother in law Philip of Megalopolis.

In December 192, the Seleucids and their Aetolian allies launched a campaign against the Thessalian League from the south, while the Athamanian army attacked from the west. Antiochus rapidly seized much of southern Thessaly, withdrawing to his winter quarters after running out of supplies. In early March 191 BC, the Seleucids invaded Acarnania, aiming at depriving the Roman fleet of ports on the western coast of Greece. After a brief campaign, Antiochus seized control of half of the Acarnanian League and gained the allegiance of its Strategos Klytos. At the same time Roman consul Manius Acilius Glabrio crossed from Brundisium to Illyria with an army of 20,000 infantry, 2,000 cavalry and 15 war elephants. Glabrio's army brought the total of the Roman and allied forces in Greece to 36,000 men, significantly outnumbering that of the Seleucids and their allies. In the meantime, Philip V and Roman propraetor Baebius launched parallel offensives in Thessaly and Athamania, quickly erasing Seleucid gains in the region. Glabrio and Philip's armies united at Limnaion before joining with that of Baebius at Pellina. Upon being alerted about the enemy's advance into Thessaly and the disintegration of the Athamanian army, Antiochus returned to Chalcis; gathering his scattered garrisons along the way.

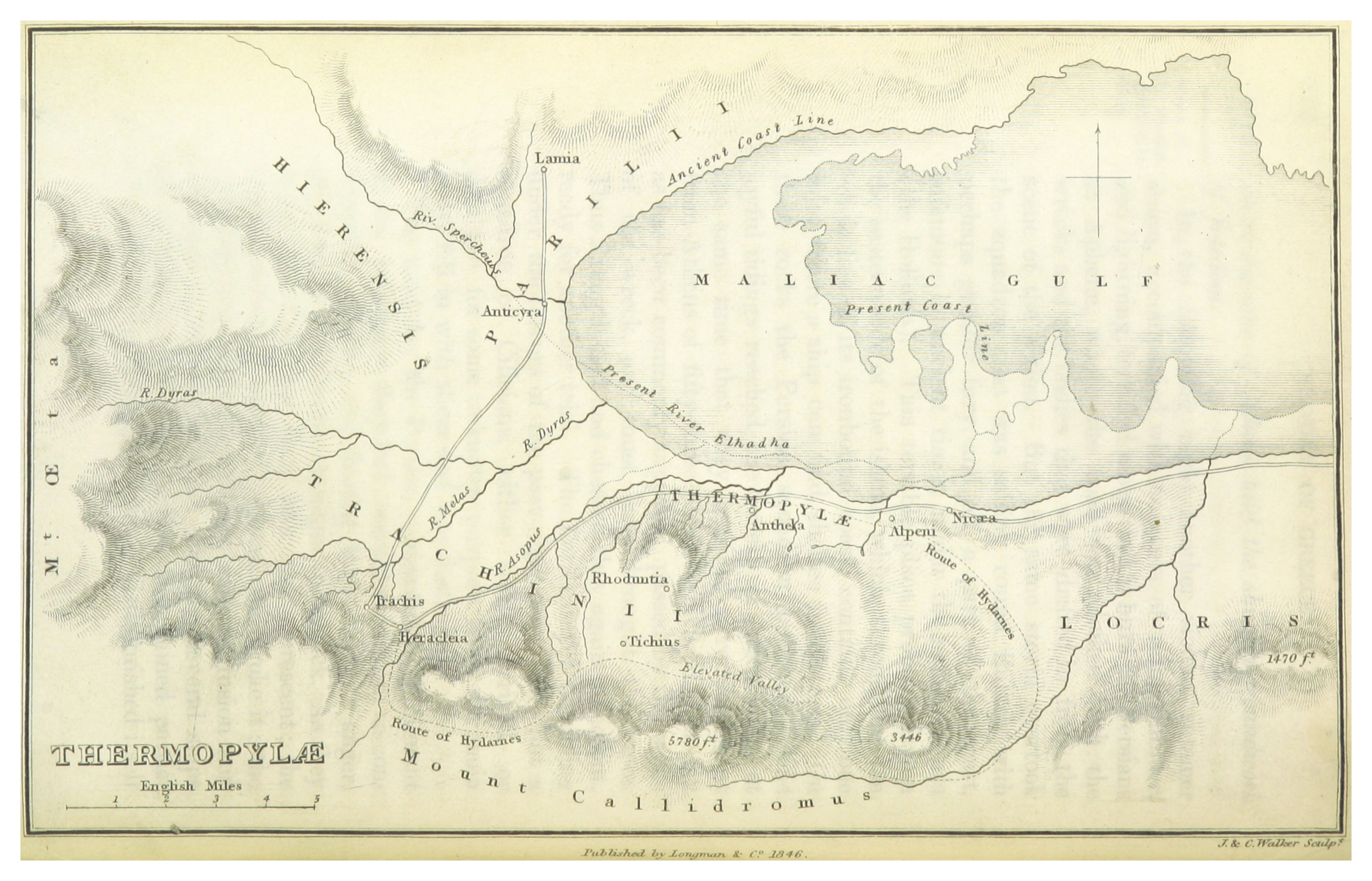
Map of 1876, depicting the coast line in the time of Herodotus, and the coast line at the time of the map (1876). Thermopylae pass is between Alpeni and Anthela.

Antiochus marched to Lamia with his entire force of 12,000 infantry, 500 cavalry and 16 war elephants, simultaneously ordering the Aetolians to mobilize there. Only 4,000 men answered his call, as the Aetolians feared that their homeland was on the brink of invasion. Fearing encirclement by a numerically superior force, the Seleucids withdrew to the Thermopylae pass. The Aetolian force was split into two armies of equal strength, garrisoning the cities of Hypata and Heraclea in Trachis; which blocked the roads to Aetolia and Thermopylae respectively. Antiochus' troops took hold of the narrowest section of the Thermopylae pass some 90 meters (300 ft) wide located at its eastern end. Augmenting the preexisting defensive wall which extended 1,800 meters (5,900 ft) up the hill to its south, ending at an inaccessible cliff. The ditch and earthworks situated in front of the wall stretched to the Malian Gulf, the slopes on the hills overlooking it were relatively gradual, allowing the Seleucids to man them with projectile throwers. Special towers were built to house mechanai, Hellenistic era artillery. Glabrio ravaged the countryside of Hypata and Heraclea, before camping at the "hot gates", half way through the pass.

== Battle ==
Antiochus positioned his Macedonian phalanx behind the rampart while the argyraspides and the light infantry stood in front of it. The Seleucid left flank was composed of a few hundred archers, slingers, and dart throwers. Antiochus led the cavalry on the right flank which formed a line behind the war elephants, with the remnants of his army forming a rearguard. The Aetolians transferred 2,000 of their soldiers to the Callidromus, Teichius, and Rhoduntia forts overlooking the pass, the rest remaining in Hypata and Heraclea. The coast east of the pass was protected by the Seleucid navy as well as the Chalcis and Demetrias garrisons. The Seleucids intended to hold the pass until much needed reinforcements arrived from Asia Minor, allowing them to face the Romans on an open field.

Despite the natural strengths of the position controlled by his adversaries, Glabrio decided to launch an assault; since he held a significant numerical advantage, commanding an army of 25,000 to 30,000 soldiers. He dispatched 2,000 soldiers to besiege Heraclea and left the 2,000 strong cavalry to guard the camp. On the night of 23 April 191 BC, Glabrio ordered Marcus Porcius Cato's and Lucius Valerius Flaccus's 2,000-man detachments to assault the Aetolian controlled forts. At dawn on 24 April, Glabrio led the main Roman force of 18,000 through the pass in a frontal attack.

The first Roman assault was repulsed, as the Romans found themselves enfiladed by the Seleucid missile troops. The Romans pressed on, their repeated attacks forcing the argyraspides and the light infantry to withdraw behind the rampart. Yet the wall of Seleucid sarissas proved to be impenetrable for the Romans, halting their advance. Flaccus likewise failed to make headway against the defenders of Teichius and Rhoduntia. Cato on the other hand discovered Callidromus at dawn, having previously lost his way during the night march. The 600-man Aetolian garrison was taken by surprise, fleeing to the Seleucid camp. Cato outflanked the Seleucids striking their camp; thinking Cato's force to be much larger than it was in reality, the Seleucids' morale plunged. The Seleucids broke ranks and engaged in a disorganized retreat, the whole army being lost, save for Antiochus and his cavalrymen.

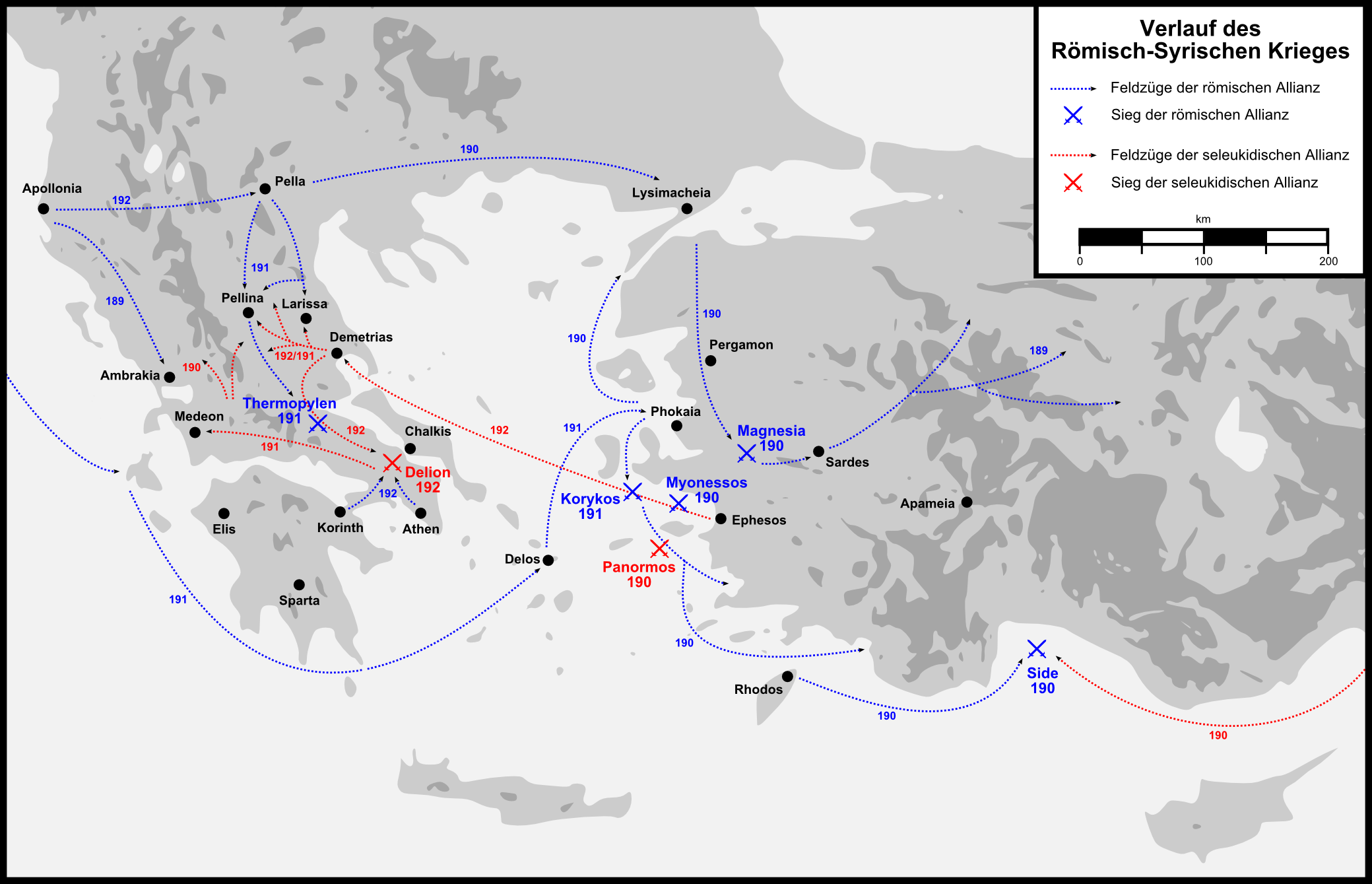
The course of the war, with locations of key battles

== Aftermath ==
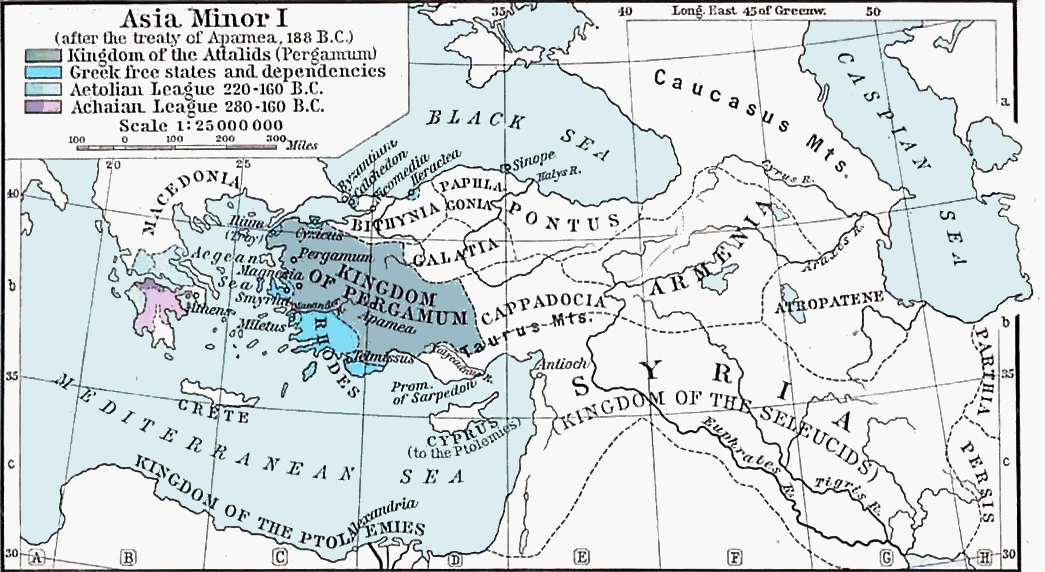
The reduced empire (titled: Syria, Kingdom of the Seleucids) and the expanded states of Pergamum and Rhodes, after the defeat of Antiochus III by Rome. Circa 188 BC.

Antiochus was decisively defeated on land and had lost contact with his navy. Upon learning that Glabrio advanced through Phocis and Boeotia without facing any resistance, he rushed back to Ephesus. When the Seleucid garrison at Chalcis followed their emperor back to Asia Minor in May 191 BC, Euboean cities immediately welcomed the Romans as liberators.

The Seleucids then attempted to destroy the Roman fleet before it could unite with those of Rhodes and the Attalids. In September 191 BC, the Roman fleet defeated the Seleucids in the Battle of Corycus, enabling it to take control of several cities including Dardanus and Sestos on the Hellespont. In May 190 BC, Antiochus invaded the Kingdom of Pergamon, ravaging the countryside, besieging its capital and forcing its king, Eumenes II, to return from Greece. In August 190 BC, the Rhodians defeated Hannibal's fleet at the Battle of the Eurymedon. A month later a combined Roman–Rhodian fleet defeated the Seleucids at the Battle of Myonessus. The Seleucids could no longer control the Aegean Sea, opening the way for a Roman invasion of Asia Minor.

== Sources ==
- Bar-Kochva, Bezalel (1976). The Seleucid Army: Organization and Tactics in the Great Campaigns. Cambridge: Cambridge University Press. ISBN 9780521206679.
- Graigner, John (2002). The Roman War of Antiochus the Great. Boston: Brill. ISBN 9789004128408.
- Lerner, Jeffrey (1999). The Impact of Seleucid Decline on the Eastern Iranian Plateau: The Foundations of Arsacid Parthia and Graeco-Bactria. Stuttgart: Franz Steiner Verlag. ISBN 9783515074179.
- Overtoom, Nikolaus Leo (2020). Reign of Arrows: The Rise of the Parthian Empire in the Hellenistic Middle East. Oxford: Oxford University Press. ISBN 9780190888329.
- Sarikakis, Theodoros (1974). "Το Βασίλειο των Σελευκιδών και η Ρώμη" [The Seleucid Kingdom and Rome]. In Christopoulos, Georgios A. & Bastias, Ioannis K. (eds.). Ιστορία του Ελληνικού Έθνους [History of the Greek Nation] (in Greek). Vol. Ε: Ελληνιστικοί Χρόνοι [Hellenistic Period]. Athens: Ekdotiki Athinon. pp. 55–91. ISBN 978-960-213-101-5.
- Sartre, Maurice (2006). Ελληνιστική Μικρασία: Aπο το Αιγαίο ως τον Καύκασο [Hellenistic Asia Minor: From the Aegean to the Caucaus] (in Greek). Athens: Ekdoseis Pataki. ISBN 9789601617565.
- Waterfield, Robin (2014). Taken at the Flood: The Roman Conquest of Greece. Oxford: Oxford University Press. ISBN 9780199916894.
