= Erae =

Ionian town

Erae or Erai (Ancient Greek: Ἐραί) was a town on the coast of ancient Ionia, mentioned by Thucydides, in the vicinity of Lebedus and Teos. It was fortified strong enough to keep out the Athenians, who attacked it. Strabo mentions Erae as a small town belonging to Teos; but though the reading Ἔραι has been received into some texts of Strabo, some of the manuscripts are said to have Gerae or Gerai (Γέραι). Pseudo-Scylax writes that it was a city with a harbor and called it Gerai.

Its site is unlocated.
