= Lucius Aemilius Regillus =

Roman admiral and praetor

Lucius Aemilius Regillus (fl. c. 190 – 189 BC) was a Roman admiral and praetor during the war with Antiochus III of Syria.

Born to Marcus Aemilius Regillus, much of Lucius Regillus's early life and military career is unknown before being appointed commander of Roman naval forces in the Aegean Sea in 190 BC. That same year, supported by a flotilla from Rhodes, Regillus defeated a Syrian fleet commanded by former Carthaginian General Hannibal (his first, and subsequently last naval battle) at the Battle of Eurymedon and, after defeating a second Syrian fleet at the Battle of Myonessus secured the Aegean Sea under the control of Rome and its Rhodian and Pergamene allies. Upon his return to Rome in 189 BC, Regillus had a temple built in honor of the lares permarini, which he had reportedly promised in return for the Roman victory.
