= Battle of Placentia (194 BC) =

Military engagement between the Romans and the Boii

- Part of Roman-Gaulish wars
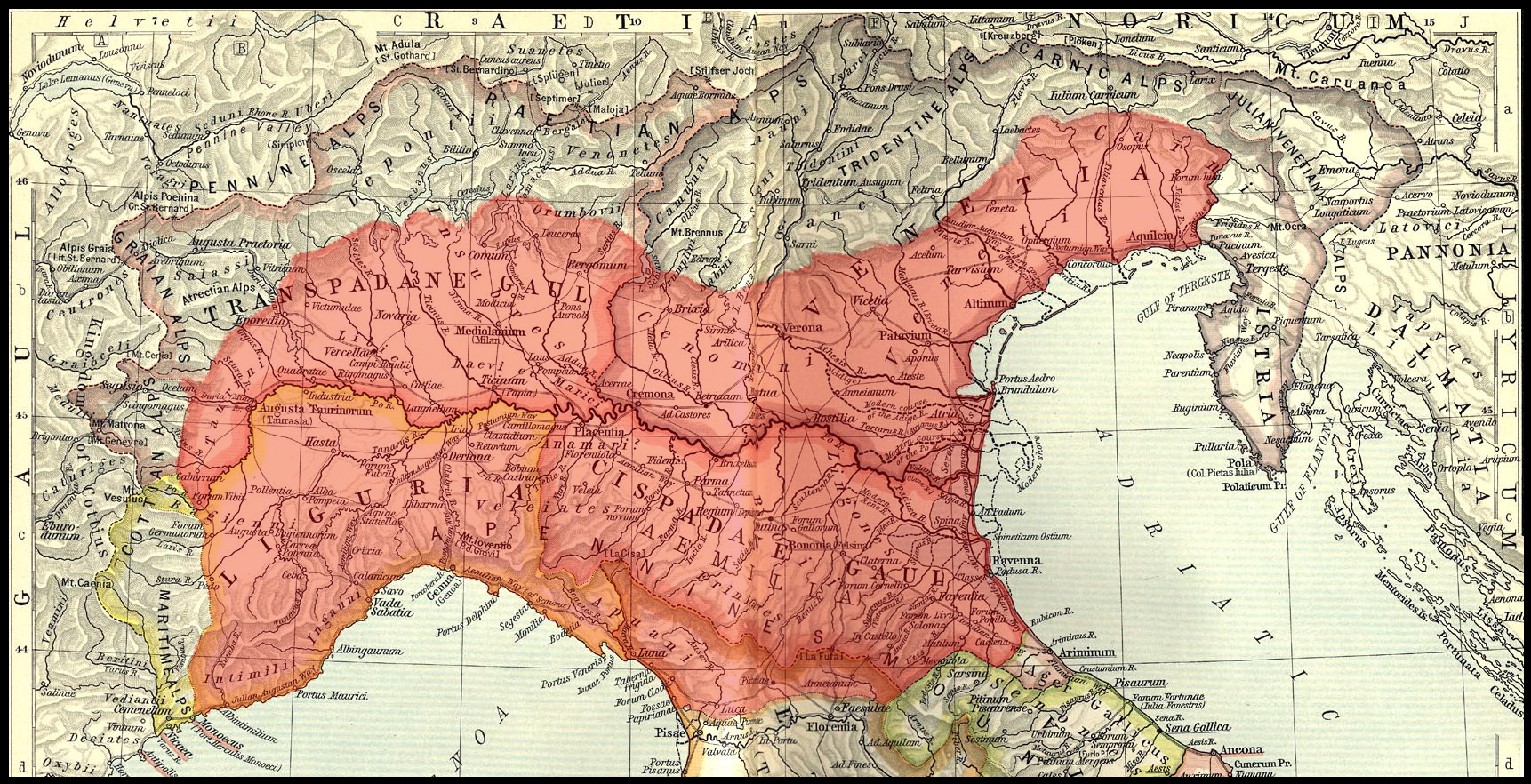
- Map of Cisalpine Gaul
Date	194 BC
Location	Modern-day Piacenza, Italy 45°02′00″N 9°42′00″E
Result	Roman victory

Belligerents
Roman Republic	Boii

Commanders and leaders
Tiberius Sempronius Longus	Boiorix

Strength
c. 20,000 men in 4 legions	Unknown

Casualties and losses
5,000 killed	11,000 killed
- Location within Italy Battle of Placentia (194 BC) (Mediterranean)

The Battle of Placentia was fought in 194 BC, near Placentia, between the Roman Republic and the Boii. The Roman army won the battle. The following year, another battle with the Boii would take place in the same region; known as the Battle of Mutina, it would end the Boii threat.

== Battle ==
Tiberius Sempronius Longus, one of the consuls of 194 BC (Note: the other being Scipio Africanus), invaded the territory of the Boii with a four-legion-strong consular army. The Boii chieftain Boiorix and his two brothers built a camp in open country to challenge the Roman army to battle. Intimidated by the numbers and confidence of the Gauls, Sempronius asked for help from Scipio.

Seeing the Romans' hesitation, the Boii decided to strike before the two Roman consuls could unite their forces. They advanced on the Roman camp, waited two days for a Roman attack and then launched their own attack on the Roman position simultaneously from all sides. Two legions attempted to sortie out the main gates, but were pushed back by the Boii. The fighting dragged on in the confined space and weapons were little used, both sides preferring their shields and bodies for pushing and shoving instead.

A centurion from the second legion, Quintus Victorius, and a military tribune from the fourth legion, Gaius Atilius, threw the legionary standards in the midst of the Boii. The Romans attacked with renewed vigor and the second legion fought their way out of the camp. At the same time, the Boii broke through the quaestorian gate and killed the quaestor along with three allied prefects and 200 men. Sempronius sent a cohort (Note: probably the extraordinarii) to restored the situation and they drove out the Gauls. The fourth legion pushed their opponents out of the camp as well and the battle continued in the open.

The fighting went on until noon, with the Gauls less able to withstand the heat, thirst, and physical struggle. They were finally routed by the Romans and pushed back to their own camp. Sempronius ordered his men to withdraw and not attack the Gauls, but a number of Romans disobeyed his order and stormed the Gallic ramparts. They were quickly defeated by the Boii, who were not impressed by this small force.

The Romans lost 5,000 men killed and claimed to have killed 11,000 Boii. The Boii retreated to the most remote parts of their country, where the Romans could not pursue them due to the forests and marshes. Sempronius retired from the battlefield and led his army to Placentia. According to Livy, Scipio either merged his forces with his colleague's and they plundered the Ligurian and Boii homelands, or Scipio went to Rome for elections and did nothing of note.

== Sources ==
- Livy, Ab urbe condita libri 34.46-48

== See also ==
- Roman Republican governors of Gaul
