= Quintus Minucius Thermus (consul 193 BC) =

Roman senator and general

Quintus Minucius Thermus (died 188 BC) was a Roman statesman and military commander.

In 202, Minucius Thermus may have been the military tribune named Thermus who served in Africa under Scipio Africanus. As a tribune of the plebs in 201, Thermus and his fellow tribune Manius Acilius Glabrio opposed the desire of Gnaeus Cornelius Lentulus to have Africa as his consular province. Thermus was also responsible for legislation confirming peace with Carthage after the Second Punic War. His actions may reflect on the earlier connection with Scipio, whose imperium in Africa was extended into 201 so he could finalize the treaty, as a result of which he received the cognomen Africanus.

Minucius Thermus was curule aedile in 198. From 197, he served on the three-man commission (triumviri coloniis deducendis) in charge of establishing colonies located at the mouths of the Volturnus and the Liternus (in Campania), at Puteoli, Castrum Salerni, and Buxentum.

As praetor in 196, he was assigned to Hispania Citerior ("Nearer Spain"). He was possibly acting as proconsul when his military success at Turda in Spain, where he defeated the Turboletae people, gained him the honor of a triumph.

Thermus was elected consul in 193 and assigned Liguria as his province. From his base in Pisa, he waged war against the Ligurians with little success. Among his officers was the prefect M. Cincius Alimentus. His command was extended for the following year, during which time he defeated the Ligurian forces near Pisa. He remained as proconsul in Liguria for 191–190, until he was instructed by the senate to transfer command to Scipio Nasica. He was denied a triumph upon return.

In 189–188, Thermus took part in the ten-man commission (decemviri) who assisted the proconsul Manlius Vulso in concluding the treaty with Antiochus III and making a settlement in Asia. Thermus went with Manlius to administer the oath that ratified the treaty. He was killed while returning through Thrace with Manlius.

Political offices
Preceded by Scipio Africanus II; Ti. Sempronius Longus	Roman consul 193 BC; With: L. Cornelius Merula	Succeeded by L. Quinctius Flamininus; Gn. Domitius Ahenobarbus
