= Battle of Modena =

The Battle of Modena may refer to:

- Battle of Mutina (193 BC), a defeat of the Boii by Roman Republic's forces
- Battle of Mutina (43 BC), a defeat of Mark Antony's army by Roman Republic's forces
- Battle of Modena (1799), a minor victory of Jacques MacDonald's French First Republic army over Prince Friedrich von Hohenzollern's Austrian division
- Battle of the Panaro, a defeat of Frederick Bianchi's Austrian division by Joachim Murat's Neapolitan army in 1815
