= Tiberius Sempronius Longus =

Tiberius Sempronius Longus may refer to:

- Tiberius Sempronius Longus (consul 218 BC), who fought Hannibal's forces in the Second Punic War
- Tiberius Sempronius Longus (consul 194 BC), who defended Roman settlements from the Gauls
