= Quinctius Flamininus =

Quinctius Flamininus is the name of:

- Titus Quinctius Flamininus (228–174 BC), Roman politician and general instrumental in the Roman conquest of Greece
- Lucius Quinctius Flamininus, younger brother of Titus, Roman consul in 192 BC
