= Roman–Seleucid war =

War between Rome and the Seleucid Empire, 192–188 BC

- Part of the Roman–Greek wars
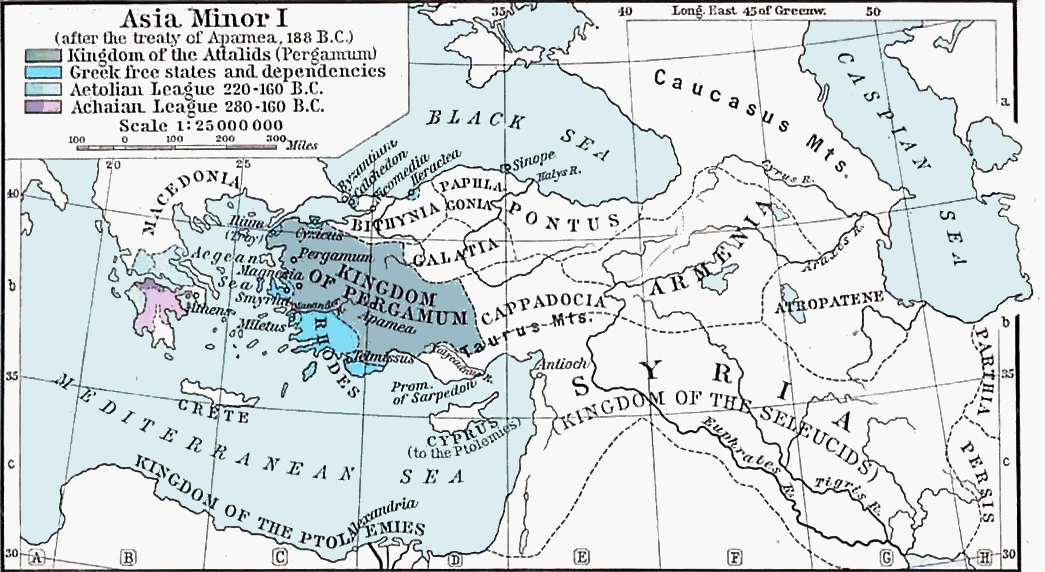
- Asia Minor after the war
Date	192–188 BC
Location	Greece and Asia Minor
Result	Roman coalition victory
Territorial changes	Treaty of Apamea: Pergamon annexes Lydia, Phrygia, Mysia, Pisidia and Pamphylia from Seleucid Empire.; Rhodes annexes Caria and Lycia.; Aetolian League becomes subject to Rome

Belligerents
Seleucid Empire; Aetolian League; Galatians; Athamania; Cappadocia; Elis; Co-belligerent: Messene	Roman Republic; Pergamon; Rhodes; Macedon; Achaean League; Thessalian League; Beotian League; Acarnanian League; Issa; Kos; Erythrai; Athens; Carthage; Numidia

Commanders and leaders
Antiochus III; Zeuxis; Hannibal; Polyxenidas	Manius Acilius; Lucius Aemilius; Scipio Asiaticus; Scipio Africanus; Gaius Salinator; Eumenes II; Eudamus; Philip V

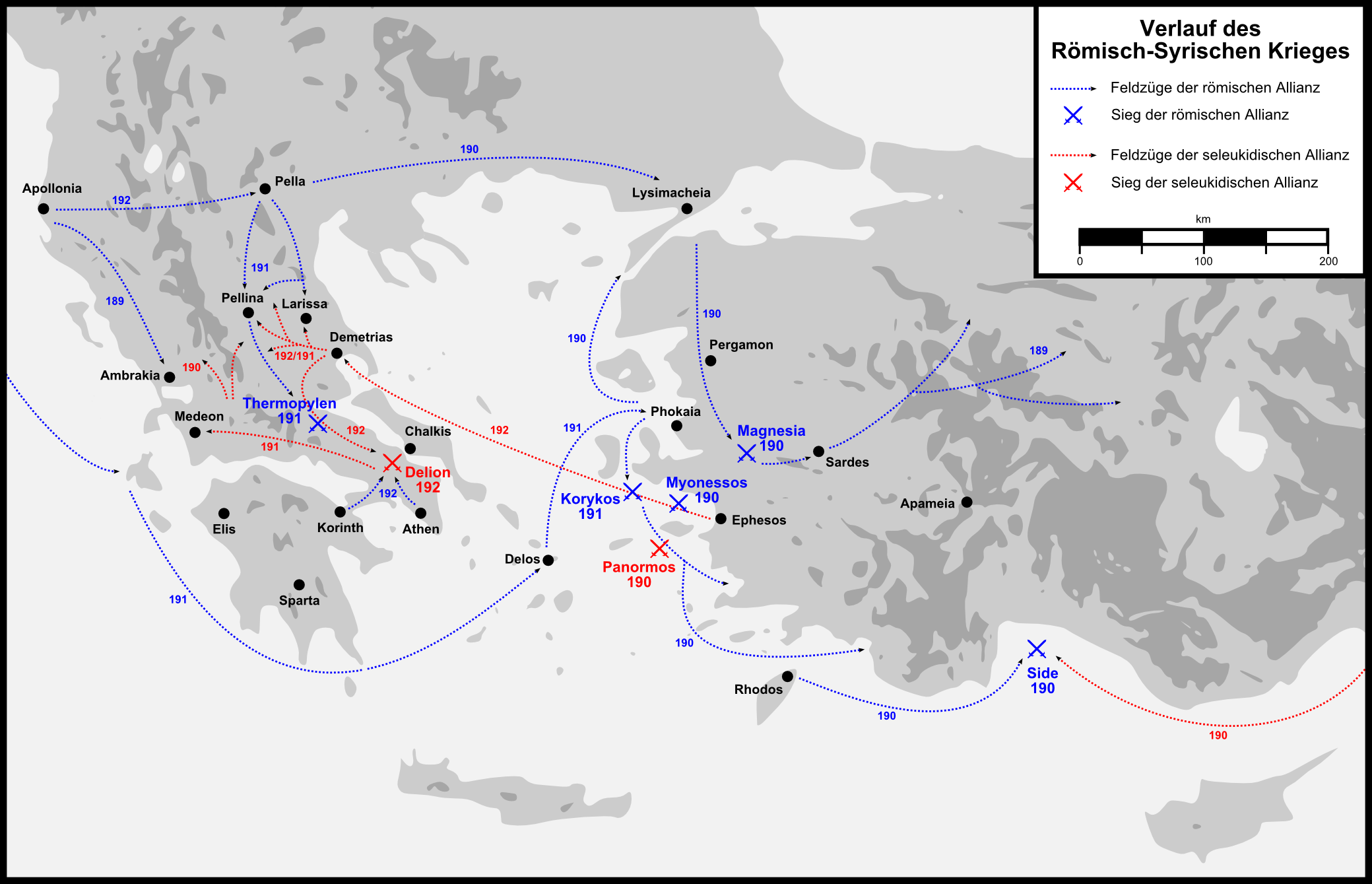
The course of the war, with locations of key battles (Roman victories in blue, Seleucid in red)

The Roman–Seleucid war (192–188 BC), also called the Aetolian war, Antiochene war, Syrian war, and Syrian-Aetolian war was a military conflict between two coalitions, one led by the Roman Republic and the other led by the Seleucid king Antiochus III. The fighting took place in modern-day southern mainland Greece, the Aegean Sea, and Asia Minor.

The war was the consequence of a "cold war" between both powers, which had started in 196 BC. In this period, the Romans and the Seleucids attempted to settle spheres of influence by forging alliances with the small Greek city-states. Also important were the Romans and Seleucids' irreconcilable visions for the Aegean: the Romans saw Greece as their sphere of influence and Asia Minor as a buffer area while the Seleucids saw Asia Minor as a core part of their empire with Greece as the buffer zone.

After the Aetolian League triggered a small war which drew in Antiochus, Rome and the Seleucids came to blows. Antiochus landed in Greece but was forced to retreat across the Aegean after being defeated at the Battle of Thermopylae by the consul of 191 BC, Manius Acilius Glabrio. The Aetolians attempted to reach a settlement with the Romans but were unsuccessful in the face of excessive Roman demands. Antiochus' naval forces in the Aegean were defeated in two major engagements which saw the Roman coalition gain naval superiority. The consul of 190 BC, Lucius Cornelius Scipio, then pursued Antiochus into Asia Minor with the support of the Pergamene king Eumenes II.

Antiochus started peace negotiations, which he broke off after exorbitant Roman demands. But after he was defeated by the Roman-led coalition at the Battle of Magnesia, he sued for peace, accepting those Roman demands. In the resulting peace of Apamea, Antiochus ceded all of his territories beyond the Taurus Mountains to Roman allies and paid a large indemnity covering the Roman cost of the war. The Aetolians reached separate terms with the Romans, reducing them to a Roman client state, the next year. The Romans thereby gained uncontested hegemony over the Greek city-states in the Balkans and Asia Minor while also largely excluding the Seleucids from the Mediterranean.

== Background and cold war ==
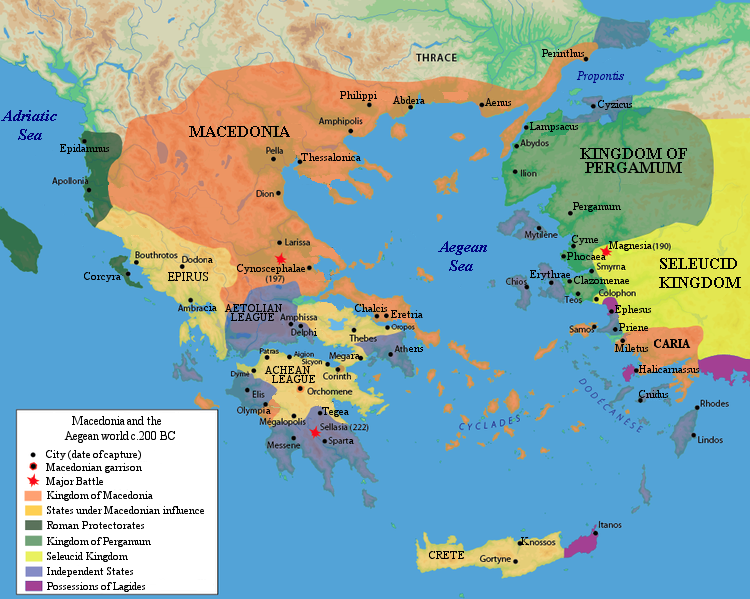
Greece and the Aegean on the eve of the Second Macedonian War (200 BC).

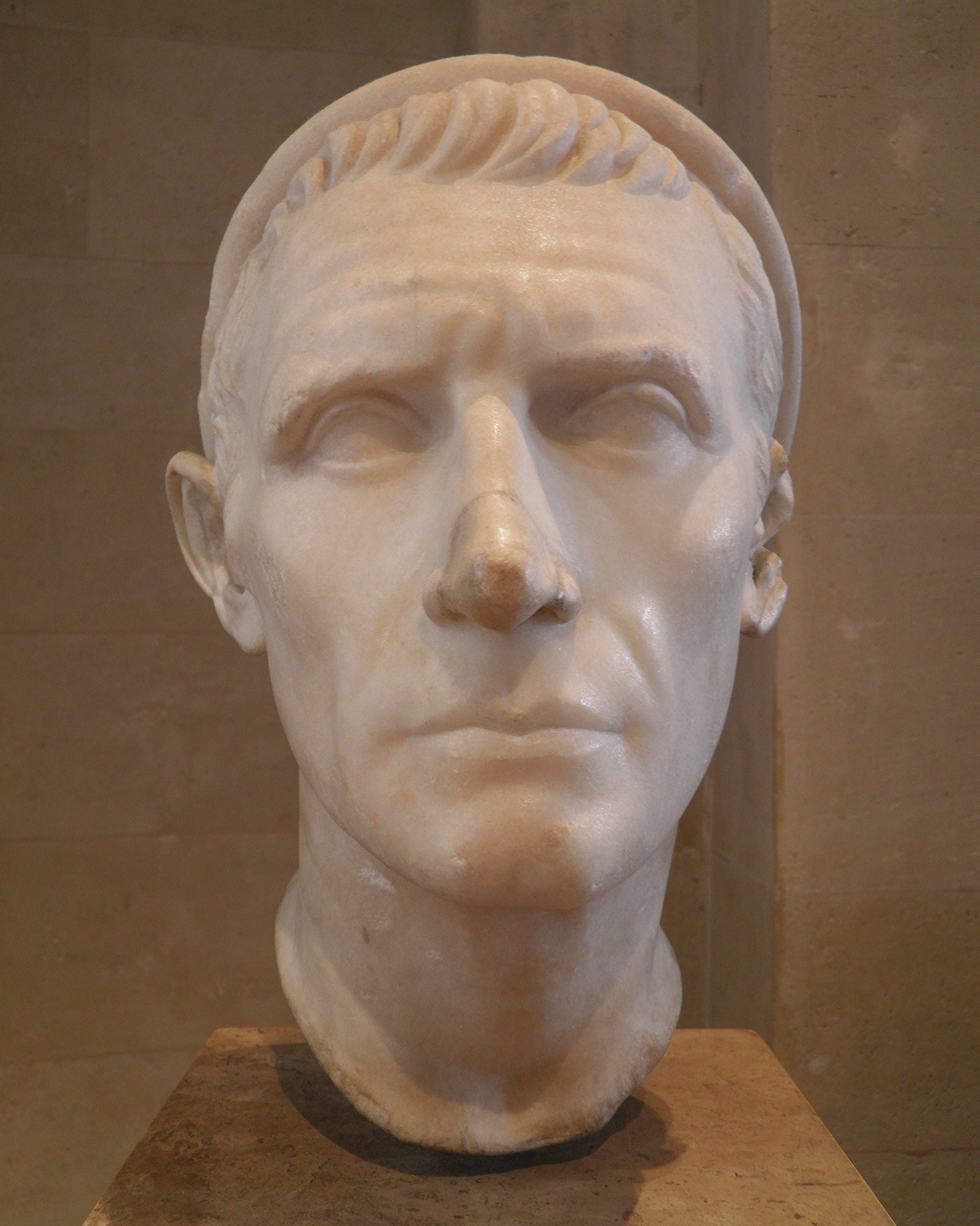
Head, possibly a Roman copy of a Hellenistic original, depicting Antiochus III of the Seleucid Empire

From 212 to 205 BC, Antiochus III campaigned to reassert Seleucid authority over Armenia and Iran. After reducing those areas to vassals and signing treaties with the Parthians and the Bactrians, he returned home. He then concentrated on restoring his empire's control over large portions of Asia Minor. He was, however, interrupted by the death of Ptolemy IV Philopator of Egypt in summer 204 BC, which gave him an opportunity to take Coele Syria, Phoenicia, and Judea from the Ptolemies in the aftermath of the Fifth Syrian War. Successful in Syria and Judea, he spent some time there before turning back to Asia Minor some time in 197 BC. For these victories, he took the title "Great King" (Ancient Greek: βασιλεὺς μέγας).

With the conquests of Antiochus and the Roman victory in the Second Punic War, the Aegean was now flanked by two great powers on its east and west. Roman influence continued expanding as a result of the Second Macedonian War (200–197 BC), fought between the republic and Philip V of Macedon. After Philip invaded the Cycladic islands and declared war on Rhodes and Pergamum, the defenders called on Roman aid in summer of 201 BC after major setbacks in the war. The Roman senate, influenced by a senatorial "circle of 'eastern experts'" led by Publius Sulpicius Galba Maximus, who were veterans of the First Macedonian War, sent an embassy to Philip with an ultimatum. Over the next three years, the Romans fought Philip and by 197 BC were victorious; in the aftermath, the Aegean's interstate politics had shifted considerably. The Roman coalition had defeated Philip, but Antiochus at the same time was consolidating Seleucid influence in western Asia Minor.

During the war, Antiochus' relations with Rome were cordial: at the start of the war, he had promised no aid to Philip before a Roman embassy; he complied with a Roman embassy demanding he withdraw from Pergamum, a Roman ally in the war; the Romans did nothing to prevent his occupation of areas further east in Asia Minor. After the war, however, Roman opinion soured, largely due to Antiochus' having crossed into Europe after the war's end, threatening Roman buffers in the Balkans, all while expressing a delayed congratulations to Rome. The Romans, in the peace after the Macedonian war, declared four towns – formerly Philip's possessions – to be free even though they were within Antiochus' sphere of influence.

The Romans also – in the aftermath of the war – proclaimed freedom for all Greeks, explicitly including even those in Asia Minor under Antiochus' control. The Romans gave a further warning against intervening in Greek affairs or entering Europe at the Isthmian Games of 196 BC. A later embassy reached the king at Lysimachia and demanded Antiochus' withdrawal from Ptolemaic lands in Asia Minor, his withdrawal from lands formerly Philip's, and that he refrain from attacking any Greek cities (as all Greek cities had been declared free); the Romans had no right to demand the last element and Antiochus deftly brushed off Roman demands by appealing to his historic claims in the region and protesting the lack of any legitimate Roman interest in Asia Minor after his marriage alliance with Ptolemy and his own declaration of freedom for the Greek cities in Asia Minor. His responses largely blunted any possible Roman causes for war: "if Rome had wanted to fight at this point, she would have had to fight for the freedom of cities that Antiochus [declared] free, for the settlement of disputes that he was willing to refer to arbitration, and for the return to Ptolemy of cities that Ptolemy apparently did not want back".

More fundamentally, however, the Romans and Antiochus had incompatible international visions: Rome saw their sphere of influence running directly to the Hellespont with Asia Minor as a buffer region; Antiochus saw Asia Minor as his sphere with Greece acting as a buffer. In the interim, Rome pursued a policy of building goodwill among the Greek states to avoid seeming the aggressor and, if attacked, to draw neutral cities to Rome's cause. Any Seleucid move against Greek cities would paint them as the aggressors.

== Outbreak ==
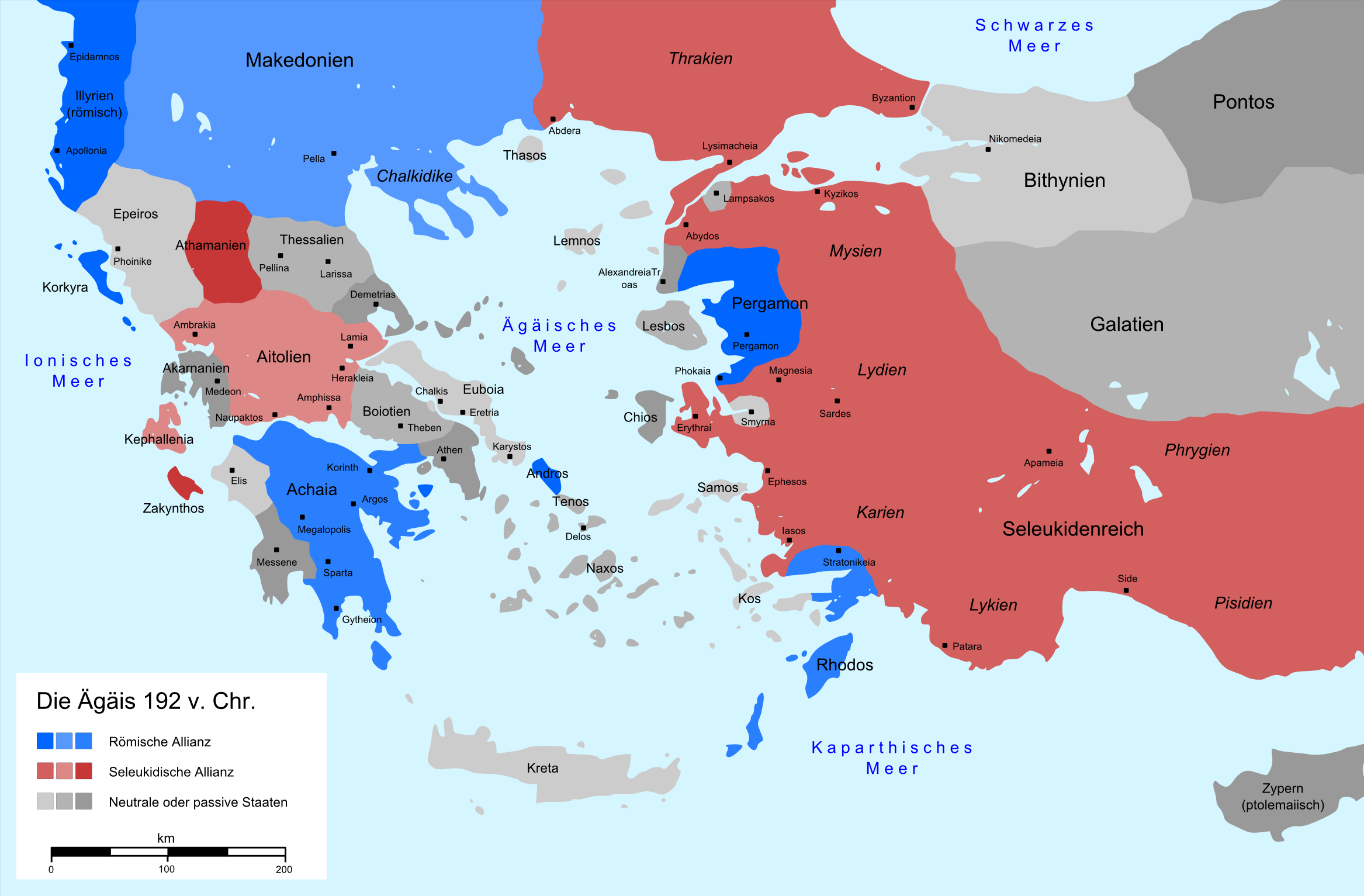
The Aegean world at the outbreak of the war in 192 BC Seleucid Empire and allies Roman Republic and allies Neutral states

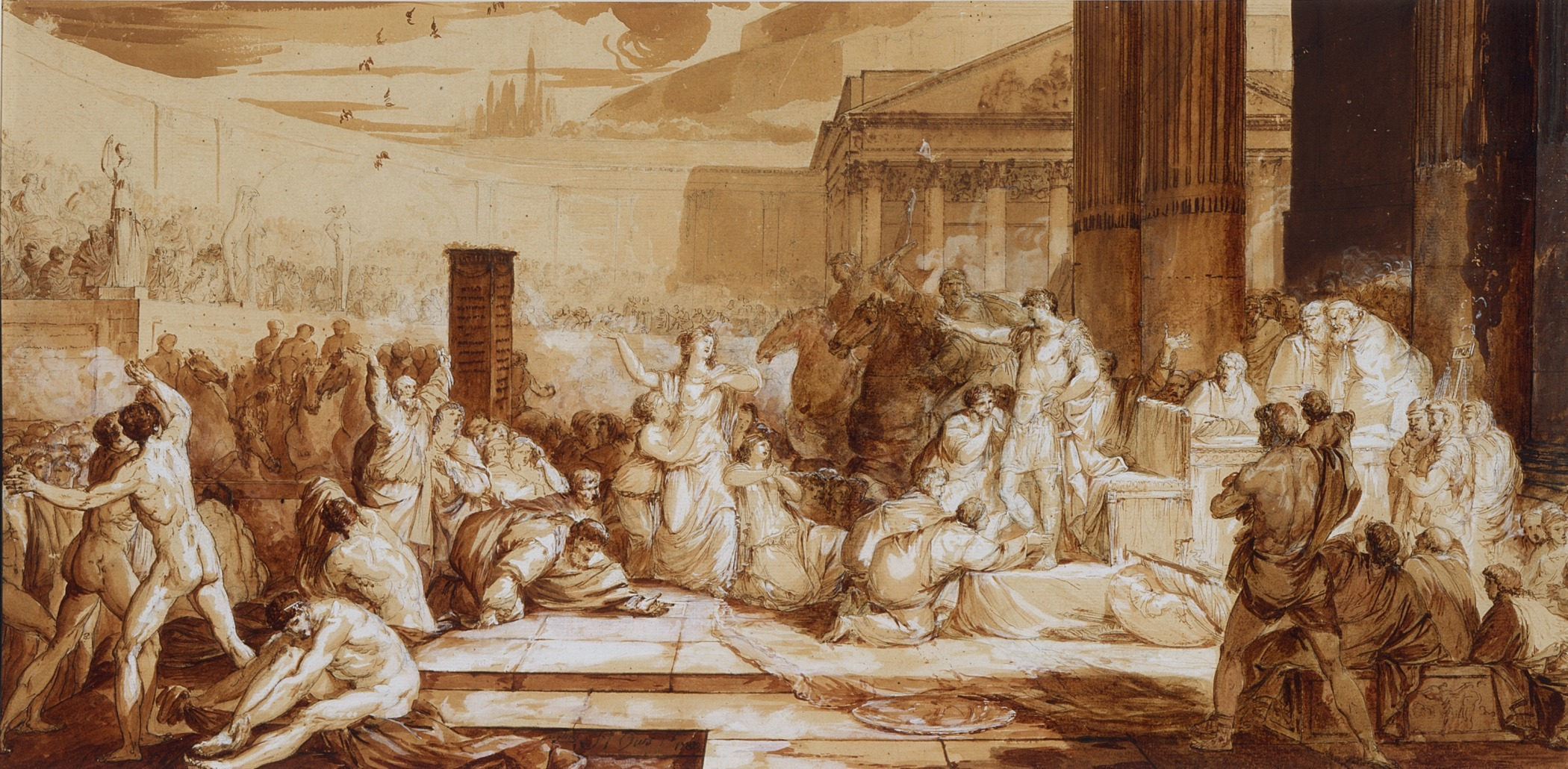
This 18th century drawing depicts Flamininus announcing the freedom of the Greeks at the Isthmian Games in 196 BC.

Roman forces in Greece, under Titus Quinctius Flamininus, largely withdrew after proclaiming its freedom from Roman control or taxation in 195 BC. Antiochus, at the same time, operated a large army in Europe against tribes in Thrace through 194, moving into the Roman power vacuum and conceiving of the Roman withdrawal as a retreat. At a meeting between Antiochus' envoys in Rome, ten legates speaking on behalf of the senate made their position clear behind closed doors: if Antiochus wanted peace he would have to stay on his side of the Hellespont and Bosphorus; if he did not do so Rome would maintain its rights to intervene in Asia to protect its allies. Provocatively, Flamininus – one of the legates – then gave a public oration before the senate proclaiming Roman intentions to free the Greeks in Asia Minor while Antiochus' ambassadors, from fear of starting a war and without authorisation to accept the Roman terms or to reject them, could only plead negotiations continue. The senate by spring 192, clarified its position and would accept peace provided that Antiochus remained in Thrace.

In late 193 BC, the Aetolian League – receptive to Antiochus' ambassadors as they returned from the embarrassment at Rome – sought to shake up the Roman settlement and draw both Rome and Antiochus into war for its own advantage. The Aetolians moved to form an alliance between themselves, Philip in Macedon, and Nabis in Sparta. The plans for an alliance failed, but Nabis was sufficiently persuaded to invade coastal cities in Laconia; the nearby Achaean League responded by moving in reinforcements and dispatching an embassy to Rome; Rome responded by sending four ambassadors to remind the Greeks of their continued interests. After Flamininus, one of the ambassadors, spoke to the Aetolian League, it responded by passing a decree to invite Antiochus to liberate Greece and arbitrate the dispute between Rome and Aetolia. This was a declaration of war and the Romans saw Antiochus' representatives in Aetolia as responsible. The Aetolians then moved troops to seize Sparta, Chalcis, and Demetrias. Successful only at Demetrias (the Aetolians assassinated Nabis but were stopped by Achaean intervention; Chalchis responded to the Aetolians with force) and able to convince Antiochus that the Greek cities were waiting enthusiastically to rebel against Rome, he landed at Demetrias and proclaimed he would liberate the Greeks from Roman subjugation.

This was the final provocation for the senate in Rome. The combination of the Aetolians and Antiochus was an unacceptable intrusion into Greece. The Romans responded by dispatching the praetor Aulus Atilius Serranus with a fleet to the Peloponnese and Marcus Baebius Tamphilus with two legions to Epirus. Further troops were levied and, in the new year of 191 BC, placed under the command of Manius Acilius Glabrio to conduct the war "against Antiochus and those in his empire".

== The military conflict ==
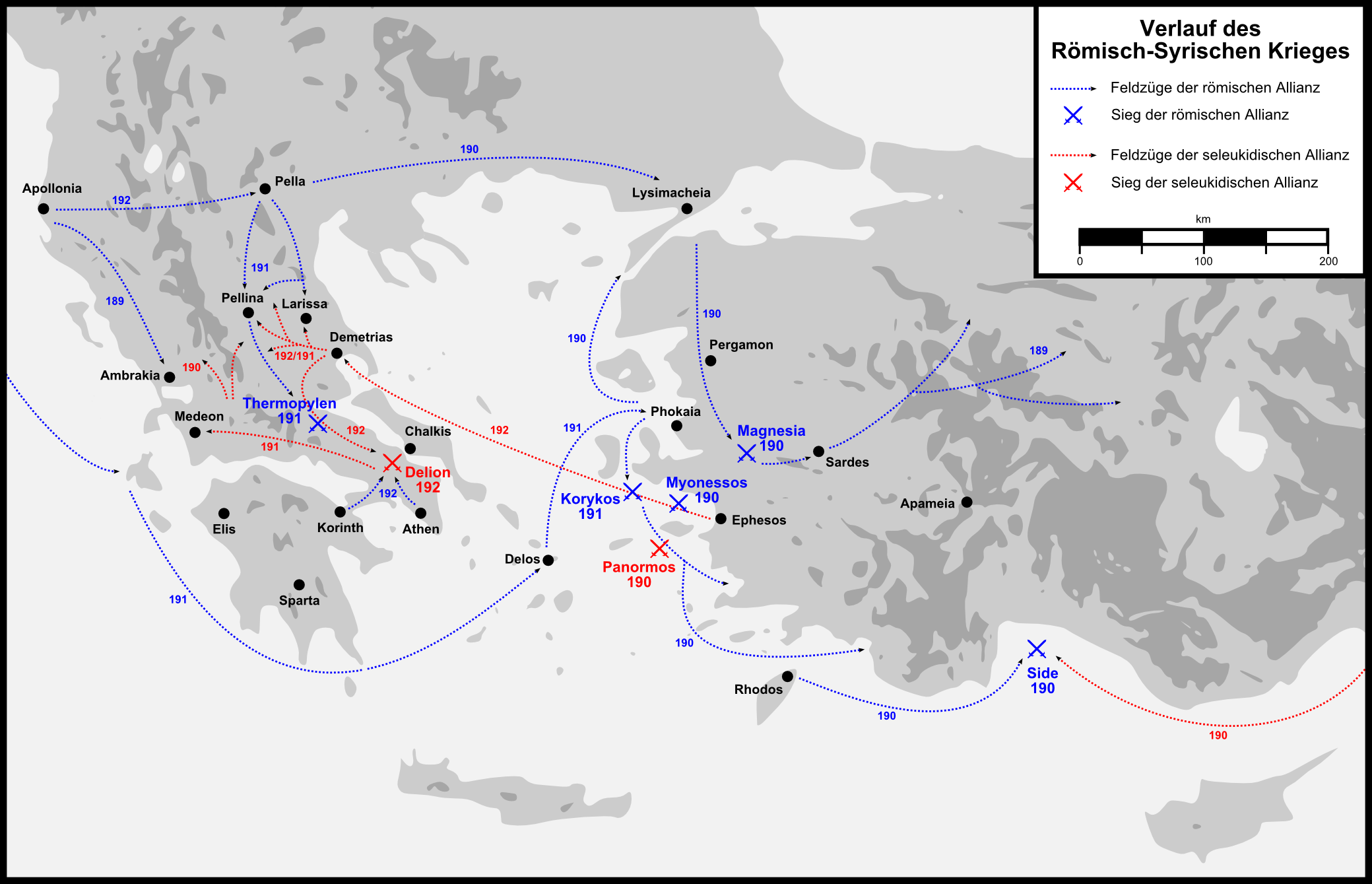
The course of the war, with locations of key battles

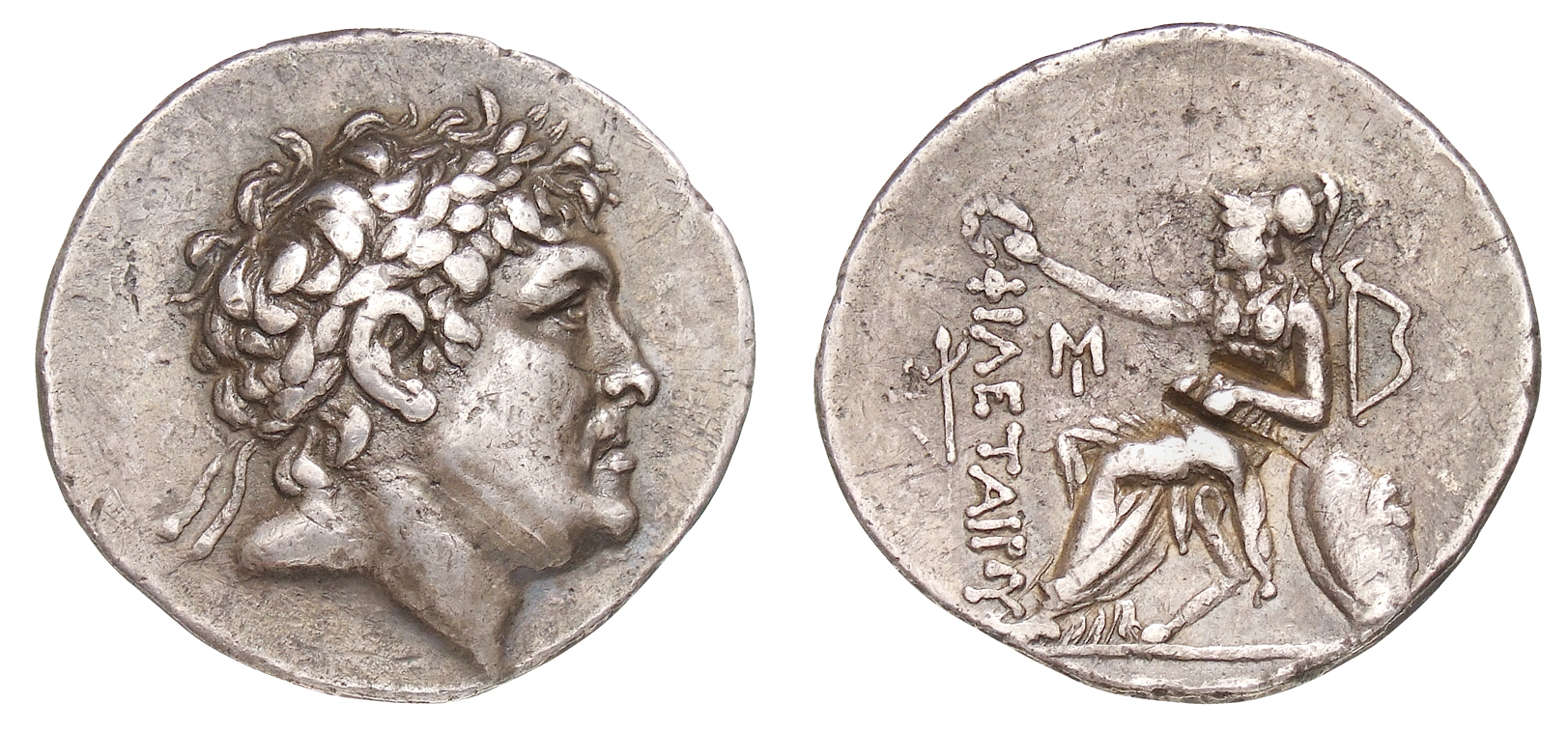
Coin depicting Eumenes II of Pergamum. Eumenes was one of the key Roman allies during the war and aided greatly in the Roman coalition's victory at Magnesia.

Even before Glabrio and his consular army arrived, Antiochus' campaign was not going well. He was received extremely coolly by the Greeks. Roman declarations of liberty had real substance and his claim of Greek liberation compared unfavourably with it; his ostensible liberations of a few cities in Thessaly had required force against their indigenous governments. The Achaean League responded to his occupation of Demetrias by declaring war, justifying it with their Roman alliance.

=== Thermopylae ===
The spring of 191 BC saw the Macedonians enter the war against the Aetolian League – they operated independently of the Romans – and occupy a number of towns in Thessaly. Antiochus moved on Acarnania, but was forced to withdraw when he heard of the incursion into Thessaly. By the time the consul Glabrio reached Thessaly, towns simply surrendered without a fight. Antiochus, receiving no reinforcements and heavily outnumbered by the Roman coalition, was forced to choose between retreat or doing battle where the coalition's numerical superiority would be minimised. He chose Thermopylae. The resulting battle was such an overwhelming defeat for Antiochus that he immediately fled Greece for Ephesus. Less than six months had elapsed from his arrival in Demetrias. With the Roman victory there, the Greek cities that sat on the sidelines quickly flocked to join the victors.

Glabrio turned his eye towards the Aetolians and captured Heraclea that year before besieging Naupactus after peace negotiations – the Aetolian ambassadors sought to surrender, but the specific rites for surrender were unclear and vitiated by their need for ratification – fell apart. Succeeded by the consul of 190 BC, Lucius Cornelius Scipio and Lucius' able legate Scipio Africanus, Glabrio returned to Rome and celebrated a triumph. That year, the Roman fleet under Gaius Livius won a battle off Corycus forcing Antiochus' fleet to retreat to Ephesus; the Seleucids then assembled a newly built fleet in Cilicia under the command of Hannibal, who had years previously fled to Antiochus' court.

Prevented from crossing the Aegean directly, the Scipios stayed in Europe, where they oversaw a six-month truce with the Aetolians so that they could send envoys to the senate in Rome negotiate a peace. In the meantime, the Scipios marched on the land route for Asia Minor. Hannibal's fleet was stopped by the Rhodians at the Battle of the Eurymedon and the remaining fleet at Ephesus was destroyed by Livius' successor, Lucius Aemilius Regillus, in the Battle of Myonessus. The latter battle cemented Rome's control of the sea. Aemilius' victory forced Antiochus to withdraw in haste back across the Hellespont to Asia Minor. When the Romans advanced into Thrace, Antiochus' allies did nothing to stop them; when they crossed the Hellespont, he gave no contest.

=== Magnesia ===
By October of 190 BC, Antiochus' naval forces were vastly outmatched by the Romans and the Scipios had arrived into Asia Minor. He attempted to negotiate for peace, offering to indemnify half the Roman cost of the war and abandon his claims to Smyrna, Lampsacus, Alexandria Troas, and other Roman allies. The Scipios, reflecting the Roman view that the Greeks in Asia Minor were part of Rome's sphere of influence, declined the offer and demanded that Antiochus cede the whole of Asia Minor northwest of the Taurus Mountains and indemnify all Roman war costs. Seeing these demands as too extreme, Antiochus broke off negotiations.

Late in the year, some time around the middle of December, the decisive battle of the war took place near Magnesia ad Sipylum. The consul Lucius Scipio was anxious for battle, as he needed a victory in December when he would be replaced in command. The Battle of Magnesia resulted in a clear Roman coalition victory over Antiochus' army. Numbers on each side are disputed. Livy reports that Antiochus commanded 60,000 infantry and 12,000 cavalry against the Roman coalition of around 30,000; this is disputed and John Grainger, in The Roman War of Antiochos the Great, argues instead that both sides had around 50,000 men.

The nominal Roman commander there was Lucius Scipio, as his brother Scipio Africanus claimed illness; however, Appian and Plutarch instead relate that Gnaeus Domitius Ahenobarbus, also a legate, was in effective command. The battle started with the Roman coalition dispersing Antiochus' scythe-chariots on his left before Eumenes II of Pergamum led a mass cavalry charge which drove Antiochus' cataphracts into his own centre. Antiochus himself was at the head of a separate wing of his cavalry, which had driven back the Roman left close to the Roman camp and therefore was unable to support his infantry. Antiochus' infantry resisted stubbornly but after their order was disrupted by their own elephants, Eumenes exploited the holes in the formation and annihilated Antiochus' phalanx from the flank.

With his armies defeated, Antiochus sent representatives to the Scipios at Sardis, where they had moved after the battle, to seek terms.

=== Aetolian peace and later stages ===
In Greece, the war continued. The consul of 189 BC, Marcus Fulvius Nobilior, was assigned to continue the war after negotiations again failed. He besieged Ambracia and later in the year negotiated a final peace with both the Aetolians and the Cephallenians. Aetolia, initially faced with unbudging Roman demands from 191 BC onwards for an indemnity of one thousand talents – an unattainable sum – which was eventually lowered; after Rhodes mediated between them and was successful in convincing the Romans to accept an indemnity of 200 talents with a further 300 to be paid over the next six years. Aetolia also was reduced to a Roman client state, required exceptionally and explicitly to "minister to the power and empire of the Roman people".

The other consul for 189, Gnaeus Manlius Vulso, succeeded the Scipios in Asia – Lucius Scipio's request for prorogation, sent in haste after his victory, was ignored – and finding a truce with Antiochus, led a plundering expedition into Anatolia to subdue the Galatians located there who had supported Antiochus.

== Peace of Apamea ==
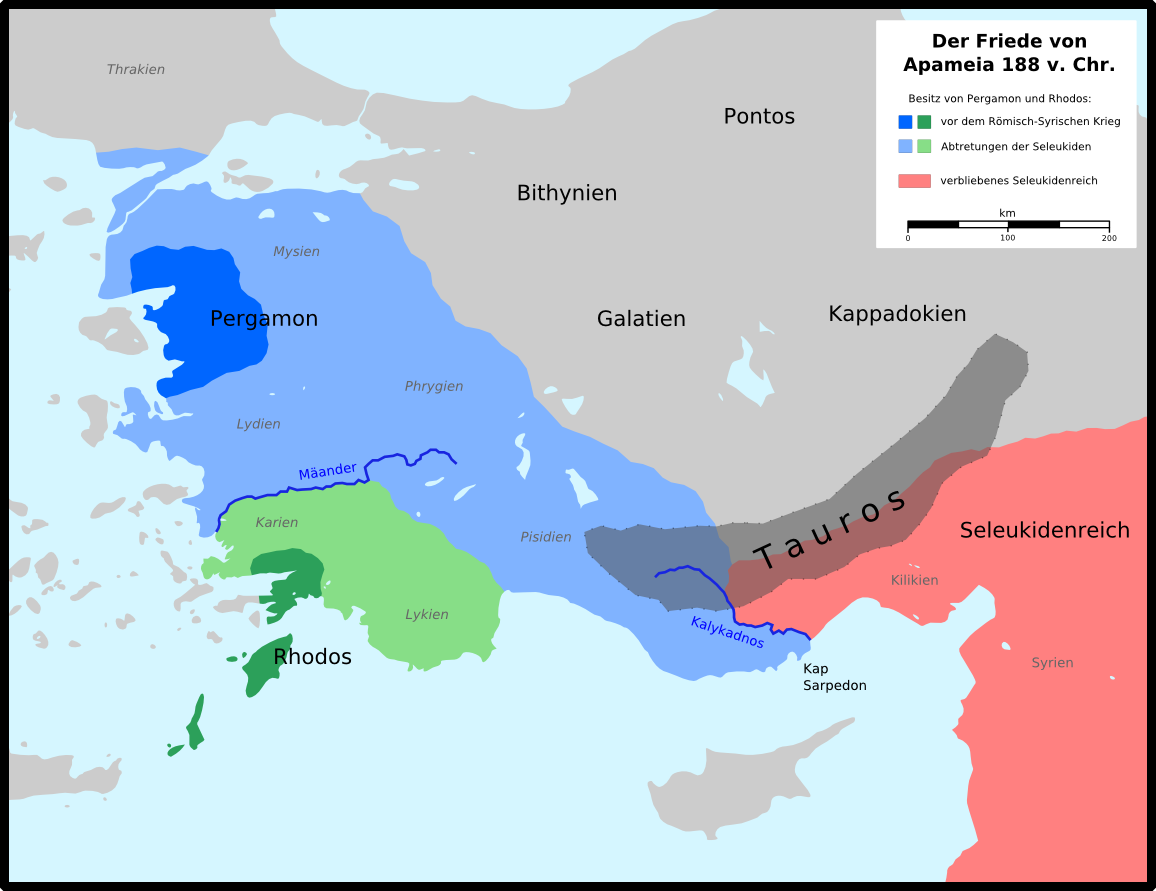
Territorial changes resulting from the Peace of Apamea Seleucid Empire Kingdom of Pergamum Rhodes

After Magnesia, Antiochus' representatives reported to Sardis where the Romans had encamped after the battle. There, they accepted the Roman peace terms, which had become more specific: Antiochus would cede all territory north and west of the Taurus mountains; he would pay 15,000 Euboeic talents (500 immediately, 2,500 after Roman ratification, and the rest over twelve years); Eumenes of Pergamum would receive 400 talents and grain; the Roman enemies sheltered at Antiochus' court, including Hannibal, would be handed over; and twenty hostages, one of which was Antiochus' youngest son, would be delivered to Rome as a guarantee.

=== Terms ===
What is today known about the detailed terms of the treaty largely comes from fragments of Polybius' Histories. The precise terms were hashed out first at Rome, with input for ambassadors hailing from all over Asia Minor (Eumenes visited in person), and later by the Roman consul in Asia, Manlius Vulso, who was assisted by ten senatorial legates. In Rome, it was determined that the republic would not treat the Greeks in Asia Minor the same way it had treated those in Europe. They would instead reward Eumenes of Pergamum and Rhodes with territory for their support in the war. Eumenes and the Rhodians were at odds in their interests. Eumenes asserted that while the Romans were the best to hold direct responsibility for Antiochus' former territories, inasmuch as the Romans were unwilling to stay, he felt he was the second-best option. Rhodes argued that freedom should be granted to the Greeks and Eumenes rewarded with Antiochus' ceded non-Greek territories. The senate, with no desire to maintain a military presence in Asia Minor, gave Rhodes Lycia and Caria south of the River Maeander while Eumenes received the rest.

Manlius Vulso, after defeating some Galatian Gauls in Anatolia and seizing from them (and, of political importance, not from Greeks) substantial plunder, marched to Pamphylia to receive the first large instalment of Antiochus' war indemnity. Hearing of the arrival of the senatorial legation, he then moved to Apamea and there with them precisely defined the Taurus line, which started Cape Sarpedon and ran through the upper portions of the River Tanais. They also decreed restrictions on Antiochus' navy, which limited it to only ten large ships of more than thirty oars. A number of disarmament provisions were also included: among other things, Antiochus would pledge to desist from the use of war elephants and be prohibited from sailing past Cape Sarpedon. The resulting treaty was then sworn by Manlius Vulso – by then prorogued pro consule – and by Antiochus. They then divided the cities in Asia Minor, with the exception of those cities which had been defined as Roman allies (they retained their independence), into the respective territories allotted to Pergamum and Rhodes. Antiochus' territories in Europe were also adduced to Pergamum, though the cities of Aenus and Maronea, freed in the peace in 196, were again liberated.

The treaty broadly followed the same goals as those of Flaminius after the Macedonian war: in areas of Roman interest, outside influences would be neutralised and Roman friends would be buttressed. The Asiatic victors of the war, Pergamum, Rhodes, and the allied free cities were bound in gratitude to the Romans. The Romans intended to pacify the region with goodwill rather than legions; so far they had been successful.

=== Aftermath ===
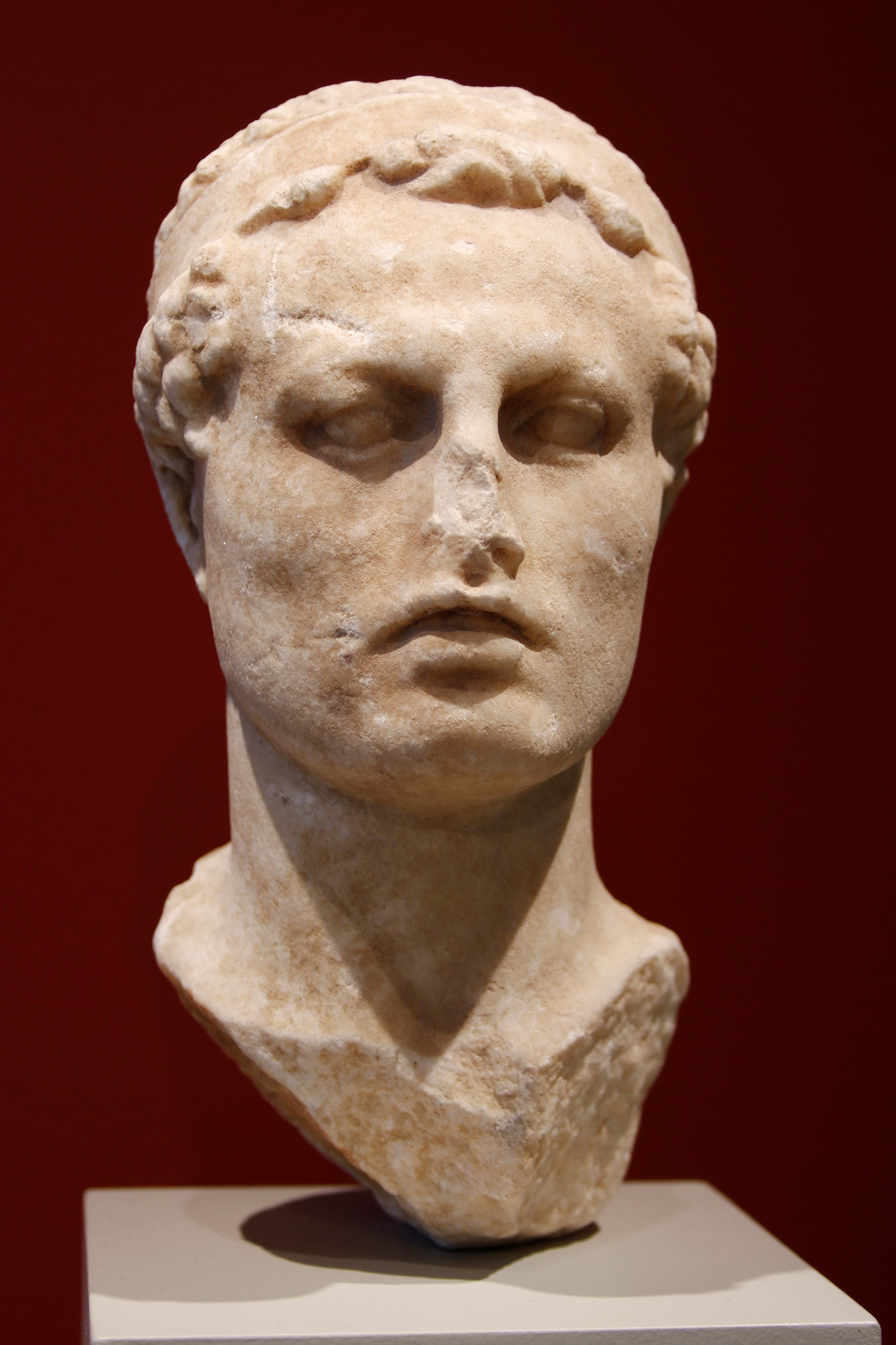
Antiochus IV Epiphanes was the youngest son of Antiochus III. He was sent to Rome in the first set of twenty hostages. After the death of his brother Seleucus IV Philopator, he succeeded him.

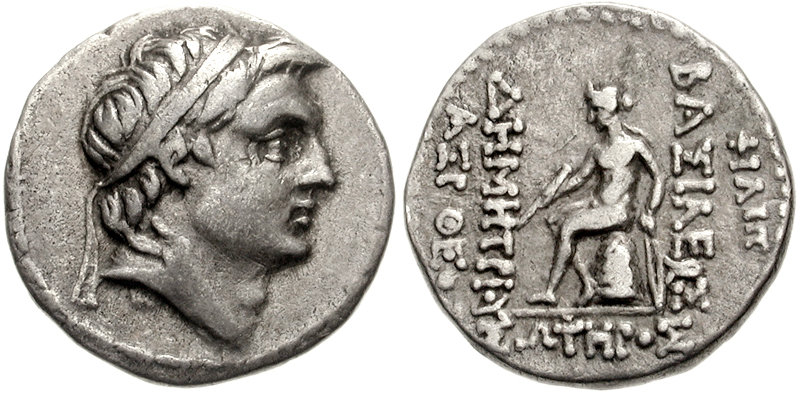
Coin depicting Demetrius I Soter, who during the reign of his father, Seleucus IV, he was one of the Seleucid hostages in Rome.

The territories formerly Antiochean were re-parcelled immediately after the treaty; this was to the substantial advantage of Eumenes, who later supported Roman intervention against his enemy Macedon in the Third Macedonian War. This, however, proved to his detriment as by this point, his usefulness to Rome had come to an end. By 168 BC, the Romans had reoriented their alliances against both Pergamum and Rhodes.

Roman enforcement of the terms with Antiochus continued in part. The disarmament provisions which prohibited Antiochus from having war elephants, reducing the size of his navy, prohibiting his navy from sailing past Cape Sarpedon, and prohibiting him from recruiting mercenaries from Roman-dominated territory, however, largely lapsed with his death.

==== Buffer for the Seleucid Empire ====
Antiochus' immediate acceptance of terms after Magnesia reflected a prudent belief that further war between Rome and the Seleucid Empire would be mutually ruinous. Antiochus still had more men and significant space to trade for time, especially given that the Romans would be forced to besiege every city along the Royal Road down to Cilicia. However, giving up the whole of Asia Minor created for Antiochus and his successors a massive buffer zone which allowed for a prolonged peace between the Roman and Seleucid empires.

The Romans did not attempt to engage in another armed conflict with the Seleucids as they had yet to gain a firm foothold in Asia Minor and despite his recent defeat Antiochus retained his reputation as a skilled military commander due to his campaigns in Asia. Instead the Romans sought to undermine their adversary through diplomatic channels, threats and bribery by spurring smaller states to declare war on the Seleucids. Roman interference made it impossible for Antiochus' successors to carry out their desired policies on their western border. In the eastern Seleucid Empire, the vassal states of the Parthians and Bactrians declared independence. This war was the only war the Romans fought with the Seleucids; the Seleucid Empire collapsed amid internecine conflict a generation later.

==== Disarmament provisions ====
After Antiochus' death on 3 July 187 BC, his successor Seleucus IV Philopator immediately started rebuilding his navy as funds became available, but largely did not provoke and remained aloof from the Romans. Antiochus' successors were also quickly able to field armies in similar sizes to those which Antiochus had fielded in his wars. The terms reached at Apamea caused no collapse in Seleucid military power.

Seleucus IV's successor, Antiochus IV Epiphanes, simply ignored the treaty's disarmament provisions: his navy by 168 BC was sufficiently powerful to support his invasion of Cyprus – itself west of Cape Sarpedon – and included both elephants and various mercenaries recruited from Roman client states. Some sources, such as Appian and Zonaras, indicate that the Romans attempted after the death of Antiochus IV to enforce the provisions of the treaty by burning Seleucid ships and hamstringing elephants. However, that the Seleucids had both ships and elephants had been known by this point for two decades and Polybius' explanation of the matter makes no reference to the treaty, instead explaining Roman action in terms of military opportunism.

Rome, through the middle of the second century, took a cordial approach toward the Seleucids; a Roman diplomatic embassy arriving shortly after a military parade in Antioch made no mention of the treaty on its return to the senate even though it surely would have seen elephants. The provisions carving out a Roman sphere of influence in Asia Minor, however, were faithfully abided: when Seleucus IV assembled a large army to aid his cousin Pharnaces I of Pontus against Pergamum, the Romans likely sent a message reminding him of his obligations not to wage war on Roman allies. So too were the provisions relating to the indemnity, payments of which were completed very slightly late during Antiochus IV's reign in 173 BC. In general, only the provisions relating to the cession of Seleucid lands north and west of the Taurus mountains and relating to the indemnity were rigorously pursued by the Romans. The other provisions – like similar treaties in the Hellenistic period – attached to the ruler rather than their state; such provisions therefore lapsed on Antiochus' death and failed to bind his successors.

==== Hostages and captives ====
Antiochus III's youngest son, also named Antiochus, was sent as a political hostage into Roman custody. After Antiochus III's death, he was exchanged for Demetrius, who was Antiochus' nephew and the son of Seleucus IV Philopator. He was held in Rome for sixteen years until he was able to escape – apparently the historian Polybius helped in the escape – and take the throne from his uncle's lineage in 162 BC.

Hannibal, who was to be surrendered to Rome under Apamea's terms, fled for Crete and thence to Pergamum's enemy, Bithynia. After Flaminius negotiated with the king of Bithynia to have Hannibal surrendered in 183 or 182 BC, he killed himself. One of the Aetolian leaders who had fled to Antiochus' court, Thoas, was also handed over to the Romans; he was later released and later became Aetolia's strategos twice more in 181 and 173 BC.

== See also ==
- List of conflicts in the Near East
- Seleucid army

== Bibliography ==
=== Modern literature ===
- Astin, AE; et al., eds. (1989). Rome and the Mediterranean to 133 BC. Cambridge Ancient History. Vol. 8 (2nd ed.). Cambridge University Press. ISBN 0-521-23448-4. OCLC 916019669.
  - Errington, R M. "Rome and Philip and Antiochus". In CAH^{2} 8 (1989), pp. 244–89.
  - Habicht, C. "The Seleucids and their rivals". In CAH^{2} 8 (1989), pp. 324–87.
- Badian, Ernst (1959). "Rome and Antiochus the Great: a study in cold war". Classical Philology. 54 (2): 81–99. ISSN 0009-837X. JSTOR 266322.
- Bar-Kochva, Bezalel (1976). The Seleucid army: organization and tactics in the great campaigns. Cambridge University Press. ISBN 978-0-521-20667-9.
- Broughton, Thomas Robert Shannon (1951). The magistrates of the Roman republic. Vol. 1. New York: American Philological Association. ISBN 978-0891307068.
- Eckstein, Arthur (1995). "Glabrio and the Aetolians: a note on deditio". Transactions of the American Philological Association. 125: 271–289. doi:10.2307/284356. ISSN 0360-5949.
- Grainger, John D. (2002). The Roman war of Antiochos the Great. Brill. ISBN 978-90-04-12840-8.
- Green, Peter (1990). Alexander to Actium: the historical evolution of the Hellenistic age. Berkeley: University of California Press. ISBN 0-520-05611-6. OCLC 13332042.
- Gruen, Erich Stephen (1986). The Hellenistic world and the coming of Rome. Berkeley: University of California Press. ISBN 0-520-05737-6. OCLC 16573469.
- Paltiel, Eliezer (1979). "The treaty of Apamea and the later Seleucids". Antichthon. 13: 30–41. doi:10.1017/S006647740000263X. ISSN 0066-4774.
- Sarikakis, Theodoros (1974). "Το Βασίλειο των Σελευκιδών και η Ρώμη" [The Seleucid kingdom and Rome]. In Christopoulos, Georgios A. & Bastias, Ioannis K. (eds.). Ιστορία του Ελληνικού Έθνους [History of the Greek Nation] (in Greek). Vol. Ε: Ελληνιστικοί Χρόνοι [Hellenistic Period]. Athens: Ekdotiki Athinon. pp. 55–91. ISBN 978-960-213-101-5.
- Sherwin-White, Adrian Nicolas (1984). Roman foreign policy in the East, 168 BC to AD 1. London: Duckworth. ISBN 0-7156-1682-X. OCLC 10664923.
- Taylor, Michael (2013). Antiochus The Great. Barnsley: Pen and Sword Military. ISBN 9781848844636.
- Tsimpoukidis, Dimitrios [in Russian] (1989). Ιστορία του ελληνιστικού κόσμου [History of the hellenistic world] (in Greek). Athens: Dimitrios N. Papadimas. ISBN 9789602060766.

=== Ancient literature ===
- Livy (1905) [1st century AD]. From the Founding of the City . Translated by Roberts, Canon – via Wikisource.
- Polybius (1922–27) [2nd century BC]. Histories. Loeb Classical Library. Translated by Paton, W R. Cambridge: Harvard University Press – via LacusCurtius.
