= Lucius Quinctius Flamininus =

Roman politician

Lucius Quinctius Flamininus (died 170 BC) was a Roman politician and general who served as consul in 192 BC alongside Gnaeus Domitius Ahenobarbus. He was eventually expelled from the Senate by Cato the Elder.

== Early career and the Second Macedonian War ==
A member of the patrician gens Quinctia, Lucius Quinctius Flamininus was the brother of Titus Quinctius Flamininus. He was elected curule aedile in 201 BC, and in 199 BC, he served as praetor urbanus. In the following year (198 BC), his praetorial imperium was prorogued by the Roman Senate, initially to take on the task of allocating land in Italy for veterans who had served in Hispania. However, his brother Titus ensured that he was given a propraetoral command in charge of a fleet around Greece, and made responsible for securing the Italian coastal regions during the Second Macedonian War.

Flamininus initially sailed to Corcyra, and having the fleet handed over to him by his predecessor Lucius Apustius near the island of Zama, he travelled slowly from Cape Maleas to Piraeus, to join the ships which had been stationed there for the protection of Athens. Soon after he was joined by the allied fleets of Attalus I of Pergamon and Rhodes, and Flamininus used them in besieging Eretria, which was occupied by Macedonian forces. He eventually took the town during a night-time assault, during which the citizens surrendered. Flamininus came away with a large collection of art works as his share of the booty after the fall of Eretria. Word of his victory quickly spread, and Carystus surrendered to him without Flamininus having to lift a finger against it.

Having secured possession of the two principal towns of the island of Euboea, Flamininus set sail for Cenchreae, and began to prepare for the siege of Corinth. Although he was able to take Cenchreae, he was beaten back when he tried to overrun the Corinthian defences. After receiving instructions from his brother, the proconsul in charge of the war, Flamininus sent ambassadors to the Achaean League, asking for their support in the war. Most of the city-states came over to the Roman side, joining Flamininus in the siege of Corinth. When the Achaean forces joined his legions, the troops under his command managed to equal the number of defenders in the city, who included a large number of Italians who had deserted the Romans during the Second Punic War. In the end Flamininus was unable to break through their defences, and he was forced to abandon the siege. He returned to his fleet and set sail for Corcyra, where he stationed himself during the winter.

In 197 BC, he was appointed as Legate under his brother's command, with the continued command of the Roman fleet, a position he continued to hold until 194 BC. His first act was to accompany his brother to a conference with the Tyrant Nabis at Argos. Just prior to the Battle of Cynoscephalae, Flamininus learned of the decision of Acarnania to join up with Philip V of Macedon, and so he set sail to blockade the city of Leucas. After a brief resistance, the Romans stormed the town, and massacred a large number of Acarnanians, who were determined not to surrender. It was only after news of the Roman victory at Cynoscephalae that the rest of Acarnania submitted to Flamininus.

In 195 BC, Flamininus again supported his brother by providing a squadron of 40 ships to accompany his brother's campaign against Nabis of Sparta. Flamininus captured a number of coastal towns by force, whilst some others voluntarily opened their gates to him, before he started to blockade Gythium by sea, while his brother eventually arrived to begin the landward siege. Eventually the town was betrayed to the Romans by Gorgopas.

== Consulship ==
In 193 BC, Flamininus was back in Italy, where he stood for election for the consulship of 192 BC. His principal opponent was Publius Cornelius Scipio Nasica, whose candidature was supported by the hero of the Second Punic War, Scipio Africanus. However, as Flamininus was supported by his brother Titus, who had just celebrated a triumph for their victory over Philip of Macedon, Titus was able to use his auctoritas to help his brother win the election, while his colleague was Gnaeus Domitius Ahenobarbus.

He was placed in charge of the holding of the Comitia elections, and was granted Cisalpine Gaul as his consular province, while Italy was assigned to both consuls. On his way north, he was involved in fighting against the Ligures. In the vicinity of Pisa he defeated them in battle, reportedly killing around 9,000 of the enemy, as the rest retreated to their fortified camp, which Flamininus proceeded to besiege. During the night the Ligures made their escape, and Flamininus took the empty camp the following morning. He then advanced into the territory of the Boii, which he proceeded to ravage.

Towards the end of his consulship, the Senate decided that elections should be held as soon as possible. They therefore directed Flamininus to temporarily relinquish command of his legions in the north and return to Rome. Obeying the directive, on his way to the city he issued an edict calling for the elections. When the elections were over, Flamininus returned north to continue harassing the Boii, who soon submitted to him. Upon his return to Rome at the end of his consulship, the Senate ordered him to levy a new army, in order that the incoming consuls could have a force ready should a war begin against Antiochus III the Great. For the following year, he was appointed a legate under the new consul Manius Acilius Glabrio, who fought in Greece with the outbreak of the Roman–Syrian War. He was eventually replaced by Cato the Elder and Lucius Valerius Flaccus.

== Expulsion from the Senate and death ==
In 184 BC Flamininus was expelled from the Senate by the Censor, Cato the Elder, reportedly for unbecoming conduct during his consulship. In a speech before the Senate, Cato accused Flamininus of a number of charges. According to Livy, who says he had access to a speech by Cato on the matter, Flamininus had been jokingly enticed by his young male lover and prostitute, Philippus the Carthaginian, to make up for dragging Philippus away from Rome and missing the Gladiatorial games, upon which Flamininus had a Celt seeking asylum called in and ran him through personally with his gladius. In another version endorsed by later writers, the lover is female. Everitt goes on to explain, on page 448, "There are variations on this story, one being that the boy was a girl, another that the man killed was a condemned criminal rather than a distinguished Celt, a third that the prostitute requested the execution and, finally, that the deed was done by the lictor, not the consul himself. However in his account of the affair, Livy (39.42) claims to have read the speech Cato made about the affair, and there is no reason to doubt him. Cato's version is likely to be the nearest to the truth."

Regardless of the theatrical accusations, the reality was that Flamininus' removal from the Senate was a part of a larger struggle between the oligarchic party of the Scipios and their opponents, led by Cato. Determined to curtail the influence of Scipio Africanus and prevent the rise of an oligarchic system within the Republic, Cato had decided to make an example of certain prominent members of the oligarchical party, the most prominent of whom was Lucius Quinctius Flamininus.

Even with his expulsion from the Senate, Flamininus remained popular with the people of Rome. Initially, once news of his removal had circulated, a contio (public meeting) was held to discuss the matter, where Cato gave a speech defending his actions in expelling Flamininus. Flamininus refused Cato's offer to vindicate himself by means of a sponsio. On one occasion, when he attended the theatre, Flamininus sat as far away as possible from the seats reserved for the senators. The people proceeded to loudly protest this indignity to a former consul, and they only quieted down when he agreed to move and take a seat among the senators of consular rank.

Flamininus was an Augur from 213 BC to 170 BC, the year of his death.

== Sources ==
- Broughton, T. Robert S., The Magistrates of the Roman Republic, Vol I (1951)
- Smith, William, Dictionary of Greek and Roman Biography and Mythology, Vol II (1867).

Political offices
| Preceded by Lucius Cornelius Merula; Quintus Minucius Thermus | Roman consul 192 BC; With: Gnaeus Domitius Ahenobarbus | Succeeded by Publius Cornelius Scipio Nasica; Manius Acilius Glabrio |
