= Tiberius Sempronius Longus (consul 194 BC) =

Roman politician and general

Tiberius Sempronius Longus was a statesman and general of the Roman Republic. He was praetor assigned to Sardinia in 196 BC, consul in 194 BC, and a contemporary of Scipio Africanus. He was the son of Tiberius Sempronius Longus who commanded Roman legions during the Second Punic War and was the consular colleague of Scipio Africanus’ father.

During his time as consul, Tiberius oversaw the Roman colonization of Puteoli, Volturnum, Liternum, Salernum and Buxentum.

During the colonization of Gaul, his legions came under siege by the Boii, who surrounded their encampment. Tiberius ordered his troops to hold, anticipating reinforcements, but the Boii attacked after three days of waiting. The exits of the fort were so packed with enemy soldiers that the Romans were unable to get out, and by the time they fought their way to open ground, Gauls had broken through the defenses in two other places. As many as 5,000 Romans were killed before the Boii were finally repelled.

Tiberius settled in Placentia, in Cisalpine Gaul, at the end of his consulship, and little is written about him after that time. When an army of Ligurians menaced the city in 193 BC, Tiberius sent a dispatch to Rome requesting troops, and an army of veterans who had served under him against the Boii was raised and sent to Gaul in his defense.

Political offices
Preceded by Lucius Valerius Flaccus; Marcus Porcius Cato	Roman consul 194 BC; With: Scipio Africanus	Succeeded by Lucius Cornelius Merula; Quintus Minucius Thermus
