= Manius Acilius Glabrio (consul 191 BC) =

Roman senator and general

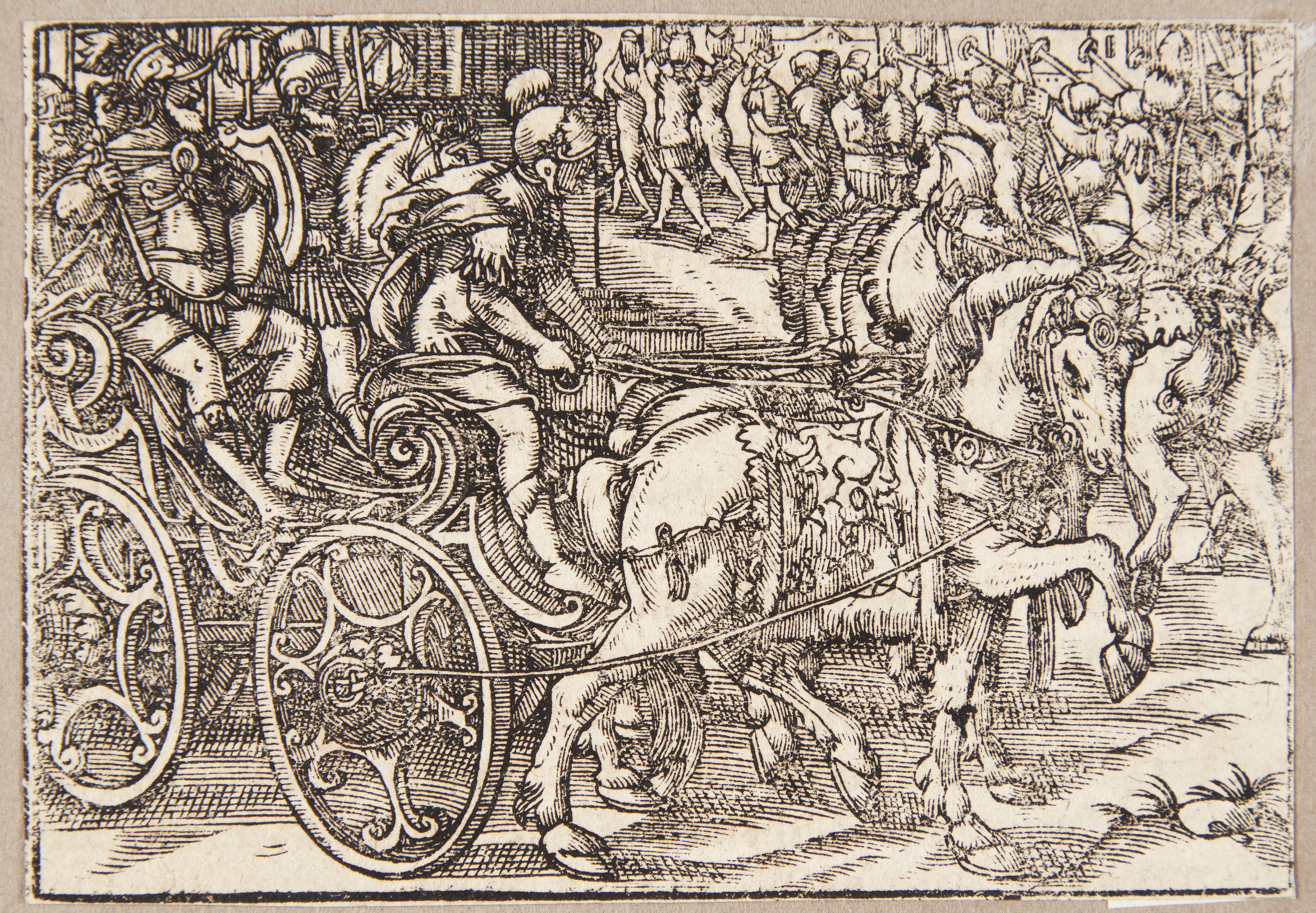
Tobias Stimmer's woodcut print Manius Acilius Glabrio's Triumph in Rome (1574)

Manius Acilius Glabrio was a plebeian Roman politician and general during the Republic. He served as consul in 191 BC while Rome was at war with the Seleucid Empire. He defeated Emperor Antiochus the Great at Thermopylae, helping establish Roman unipolar control over the Mediterranean, and was awarded a triumph. Credible accusations that he had embezzled spoils from his conquests in Greece while consul caused him to withdraw from his attempt to run for censor, after which he largely retired from public life.

He and his son—who later served as suffect consul—were responsible for the construction of Rome's Temple of Piety beside the Forum Olitorium. One of its decorations was a gilt statue of Acilius Glabrio, the first such golden statue of a citizen in Rome.

== Name ==
Manius was a less common praenomen of both patricians and plebeians, abbreviated at first as ꟿ and then as M'. The cognomen Glabrio—apparently first ascribed to this figure—derived from the Latin adjective glaber ("smooth, slick") and presumably indicated baldness, although it has been suggested it may have intended effeminately hairless instead.

== Life ==
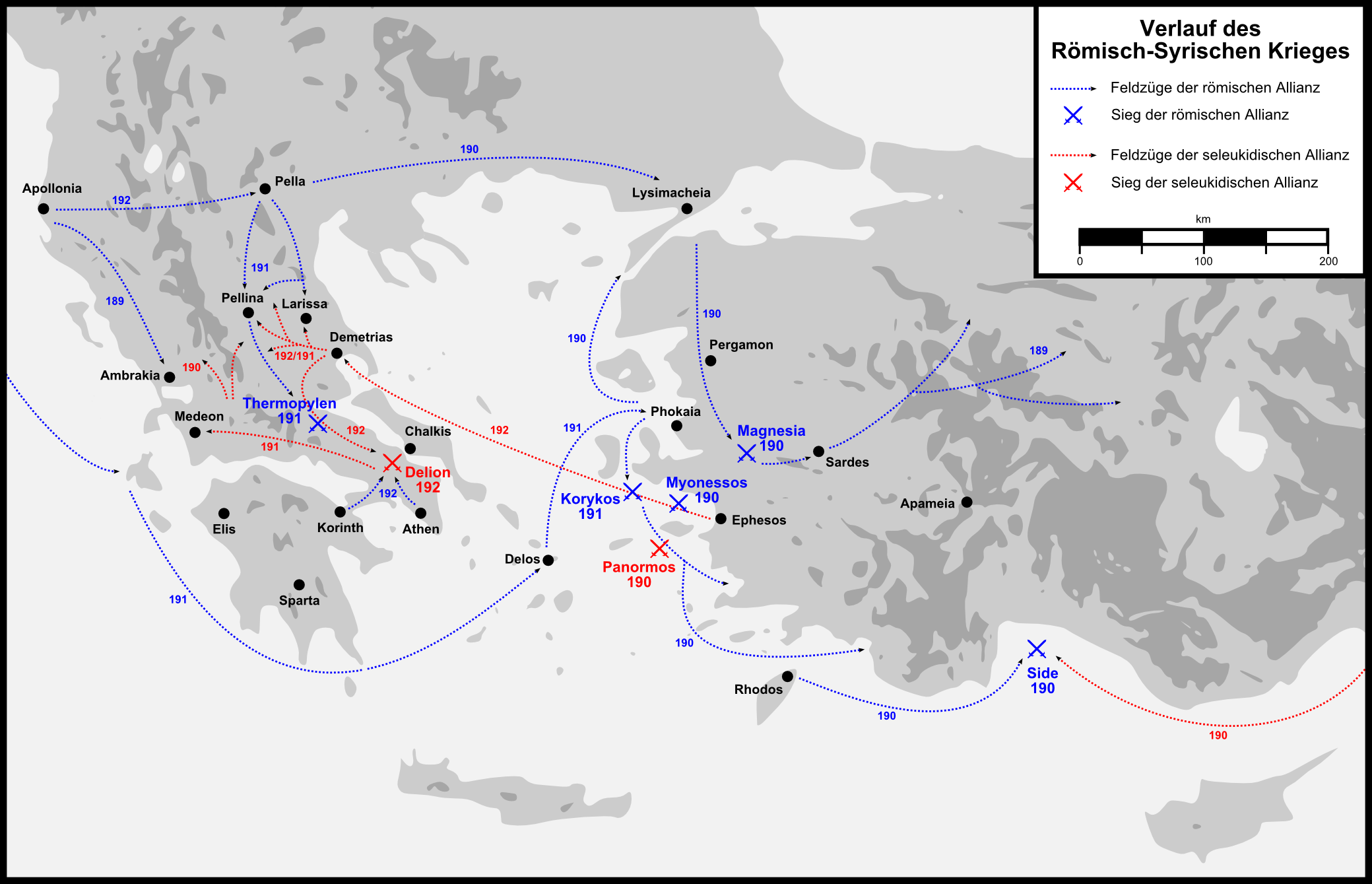
Map of the course of the Roman–Seleucid War (192–188 BC)

Manius Acilius Glabrio was born in the 3rd century BC to a plebeian family. He was the first in his family to attain the consulship, making him a "new man" (novus homo). He served as tribune of the plebs in 201, as plebeian aedile in 197, and as praetor peregrinus in 196. During his praetorship, he suppressed a slave revolt in Etruria.

Glabrio was elected consul for 191 BC with Publius Cornelius Scipio Nasica. A series of disputes had led the Aetolian League to invite the Seleucid emperor Antiochus III to liberate, in their framing, Greece from Roman domination; this was a view little shared by other Greeks, who after the Second Macedonian War had largely been left to their own affairs. From a decree of the senate, the consuls brought the question of war with Antiochus to the people and after its passage Glabrio drew its command. After landing in Thessaly, Glabrio then defeated Antiochus at Thermopylae, compelling Antiochus to withdraw across the Aegean to Ephesus. He then moved against the city-states of the Aetolian League who had resisted Roman hegemony. He captured Heraclea by the early summer, attempted peace negotiations, and then—when those failed—besieged Naupactus. In September, the former consul Titus Quinctius Flamininus—the chief victor of the Second Macedonian War—was approached to seek a truce, allowing the Aetolians to send embassies to Rome to negotiate a peace agreement. Glabrio accepted the offer, lifted the siege, and sent his own envoys back to Rome for the discussions. The negotiations fell through and the war continued. Glabrio was prorogued as a proconsul for the next year to continue military operations. While in Greece, he provided gifts to Delphi and its oracle. Considered by the Romans to have dealt moderately with the Greeks, showing leniency and self-restraint during and after the war, he was given a triumph on his return to Rome. This Roman defeat of the most powerful remaining Diadochi state has been considered the establishment of Roman unipolar control over the Mediterranean litoral.

While consul, he was also responsible for the lex Acilia, which placed responsibility for intercalation of the Roman calendar with the college of pontiffs. This was necessary because the calendar was sometimes manipulated by the Senate for political ends, speeding or delaying elections or limiting or extending terms in office, and could fall far out of sync with the seasons.

In 189 BC, the year after his service as proconsul in Greece, he attempted to stand for the censorship. He was, however, accused by the plebeian tribunes of having concealed a portion of the Greek spoils in his own house and, after one of his legates gave evidence against him, he withdrew from the race and, on the basis of surviving records, seems to have withdrawn almost entirely from public life. His death is not recorded but probably occurred sometime after 175 BC.

== Legacy ==
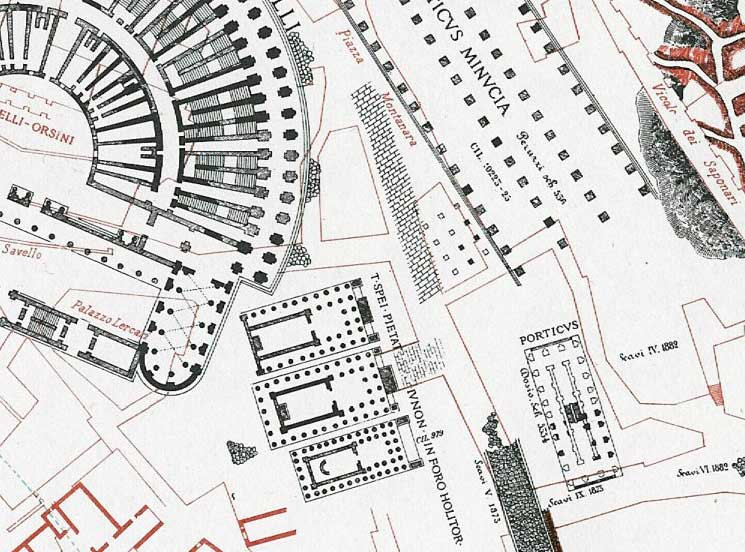
Lanciani's plan of the temples beside the Forum Olitorium based on the Severan Forma Urbis Romae, placing the relocated Temple of Piety between the Temples of Spes and Juno Sospita in the early 3rd century

Following his victory at Thermopylae, Acilius Glabrio made a sacred vow to establish a temple dedicated to piety (pietas) in Rome. His son Manius Acilius Glabrio completed and consecrated the temple as a duumvir in 181 BC. This Temple of Piety stood at the northern end of the Forum Olitorium, the Roman vegetable market, until it was demolished by Julius Caesar to make way for what would eventually become the Theater of Marcellus. The temple seems to have been moved or rebuilt, however, as its services are still recorded well into the imperial era.

The gilt statue of Manius Acilius Glabrio in front of the temple was the first gold statue of a Roman citizen in the city. Ammianus Marcellinus further credits Acilius Glabrio with introducing the practice of gilding to the city's artisans.

His son was elected suffect consul in 154 BC. Other descendants served as consul in the Late Republic and the Imperial Age, and the Acilii Glabriones have been described as the very longest-lived clan in ancient Roman politics. The family estates led to the modern name of Acilia, a frazione of Rome between the city center and the seaport of Ostia.

Political offices
Preceded by Lucius Quinctius Flamininus; Gnaeus Domitius Ahenobarbus	Roman consul 191 BC with Publius Cornelius Scipio Nasica	Succeeded by Lucius Cornelius Scipio Asiagenes; Gaius Laelius
