= Lucius Cornelius Merula (consul 193 BC) =

Consul of the Roman Republic in 193 BC

Lucius Cornelius L. f. Merula was consul of the Roman Republic, along with Quintus Minucius Thermus, in 193 BC. His province was Gallia Cisalpina. Merula closed an active predatory campaign by a total defeat of the Boian Gauls in the neighbourhood of Mutina. Since his staff officer Marcus Claudius Marcellus accused him of a delay in sending forward a reserve unit, resulting in several thousand unnecessary casualties and the escape of many enemy soldiers, the senate refused him a triumph.

Political offices
Preceded by Publius Cornelius P.f. Scipio Africanus II and Tiberius Sempronius Ti.f. Longus	Consul of the Roman Republic with Quintus Minucius Thermus; 193 BC	Succeeded by Lucius Quinctius T.f. Flamininus, Gnaeus Domitius L.f. Ahenobarbus
