= Gnaeus Domitius Ahenobarbus (consul 192 BC) =

Roman senator and general

Gnaeus Domitius Ahenobarbus was a consul of Rome in 192 BC.

As plebeian aedile in 196 BC, he successfully prosecuted, in conjunction with his colleague Gaius Curio, many pecuarii, that is, people who were grazing their cattle on public land. He used the proceeds to build a temple to Faunus on the island of the Tiber during his praetorship in 194 BC. He was then elected to the consulship in 192 BC, in which he fought and defeated the Boii, although he remained in their country until the following year, when he was succeeded by the consul Scipio Nasica. In 190 BC, he served as legate with Lucius Cornelius Scipio Asiaticus in the war against Antiochus the Great.

Livy reports that, among other omens observed during Ahenobarbus' consulship, one of his own oxen was heard to utter the warning Roma, cave tibi ("Rome, be on your guard").

Political offices
Preceded by Lucius Cornelius Merula; Quintus Minucius Thermus	Roman consul 192 BC; With: Lucius Quinctius Flamininus	Succeeded by Publius Cornelius Scipio Nasica; Manius Acilius Glabrio
