= Extraordinarii =

Elite military unit of Roman allies

The extraordinarii were the elite troops of the Roman alae, recruited from the socii, Rome's Italian military allies. The name refers to their nature; i.e., extraordinary or chosen men. In battle they had many functions. Sometimes they were reserve troops. Other times they were rearguard, scouts, and pickets. The extraordinarii also served as bodyguards of the general. They were created after the Latin War and were dissolved after the Marian reforms.

== Recruitment ==
Almost all the details we know of the extraordinarii are described to us in The Histories of the ancient Greek historian Polybius. The standard Consular army of the Republic was made up of two legions and a comparable number of Italian allied troops, termed the alae. In theory, the alae would be the same size as the legions, except for the cavalry, which was tripled; so, a standard ala would contain about 900 cavalry and 4,200 foot. In practice, there was often more allied infantry than Roman infantry; for instance, the four legions (numbering 15,000 Roman infantry) were supported by 20,000 allied infantry at the Battle of the Trebia.

From the whole force of the alae, the Consul would request the praefecti sociorum (commanders of the allied forces) to select for the extraordinarii about a third of the cavalry (the equites extraordinarii) and a fifth of the infantry (the pedites extraordinarii) of those men best fitted for service. The extraordinarii for a standard consular army as described by Polybius would thus number 600 cavalry and 1,680 infantry. Like the rest of the alae, the extraordinarii are divided into cohorts and turmae.

The members of the extraordinarii were picked by the prefects based on who had the best character and the best experience.

== Usage ==
On the march, the extraordinarii had the dangerous privilege of leading the army, though they could also be used as a rearguard if the army was threatened from that direction. They would also be used for other perilous tasks, such as pickets and reconnaissance. The extraordinarii also served as the general's reserves and an elite fighting force.

In camp, the extraordinarii had their tents in the command section of the Roman army camp, just behind the tents of the tribune. The equites extraordinarii were camped closest to the command tents, along with the household troops of the consul (i.e., volunteers); while the pedites extraordinarii were camped behind them closes to the camp walls. During the early and middle Republic the evocati and some members of the extraordinarii also served as a bodyguard for the general.

== History ==
It is uncertain when the selection of extraordinarii began. Franz Fröhlich, in his work on the Guard troops of the Roman Republic, speculates that they were created shortly after the Latin War, which ended in 338 BC. Livy mentions delectae cohortes (chosen cohorts) of the socii in an episode as early as 310 BC; this is assumed to be the first mention of the extraordinarii. Livy's description of the campaign leading up to the Battle of Sentinum in 295 BC also references both Campanian equites delecti as well as the use of allied troops to defend against an assault on the headquarters tents of a Roman camp, consistent with the description of the camp layout given by Polybius. Polybius, writing after 146 BC, describes the extraordinarii in detail as referenced above, though there are few mentions of these troops in other sources at this time. The formation was presumably phased out with the so-called Marian reforms when the separation between citizen legions and alae was abolished. There is no mention in the sources of the extraordinarii after the Social War.

== See also ==
- Roman army of the mid-Republic

== General and cited references ==
=== Ancient ===
- Polybius, The Histories
- Livy, The History of Rome from the Founding of the City

=== Modern ===
- Franz Fröhlich, "Die Gardetruppen der Römischen Republik und der Kaiserzeit", 1879. Aarau.
