= Battle of Mutina (193 BC) =

Military engagement between the Roman Republic and the Boii

- Part of Roman-Gaulish wars
| Date | 193 BC |
| Location | Modern-day Modena, Italy |
| Result | Roman victory |

Belligerents
| Roman Republic | Boii |

Commanders and leaders
| Lucius Cornelius Merula | Unknown |

Strength
| 2 Roman legions 2 Allied legions | Unknown |

Casualties and losses
| 5,000 killed | 16,623 14,000 killed 2,623 captured 212 standards 63 wagons |

The Battle of Mutina was fought in 193 BC, near Mutina, between the Roman Republic and the Boii. The Roman army won the battle. The battle marked the total defeat of the Boian Gauls, but since consul Lucius Cornelius Merula's victory cost the Romans dear, and his officers accused him of negligence on his march to Mutina, the Roman Senate refused him a triumph on his return to Rome. The Battle of Mutina is described by the Roman historian Livy at 35.4-6.
