= Publius Cornelius Scipio Nasica (consul 191 BC) =

Roman general and statesman

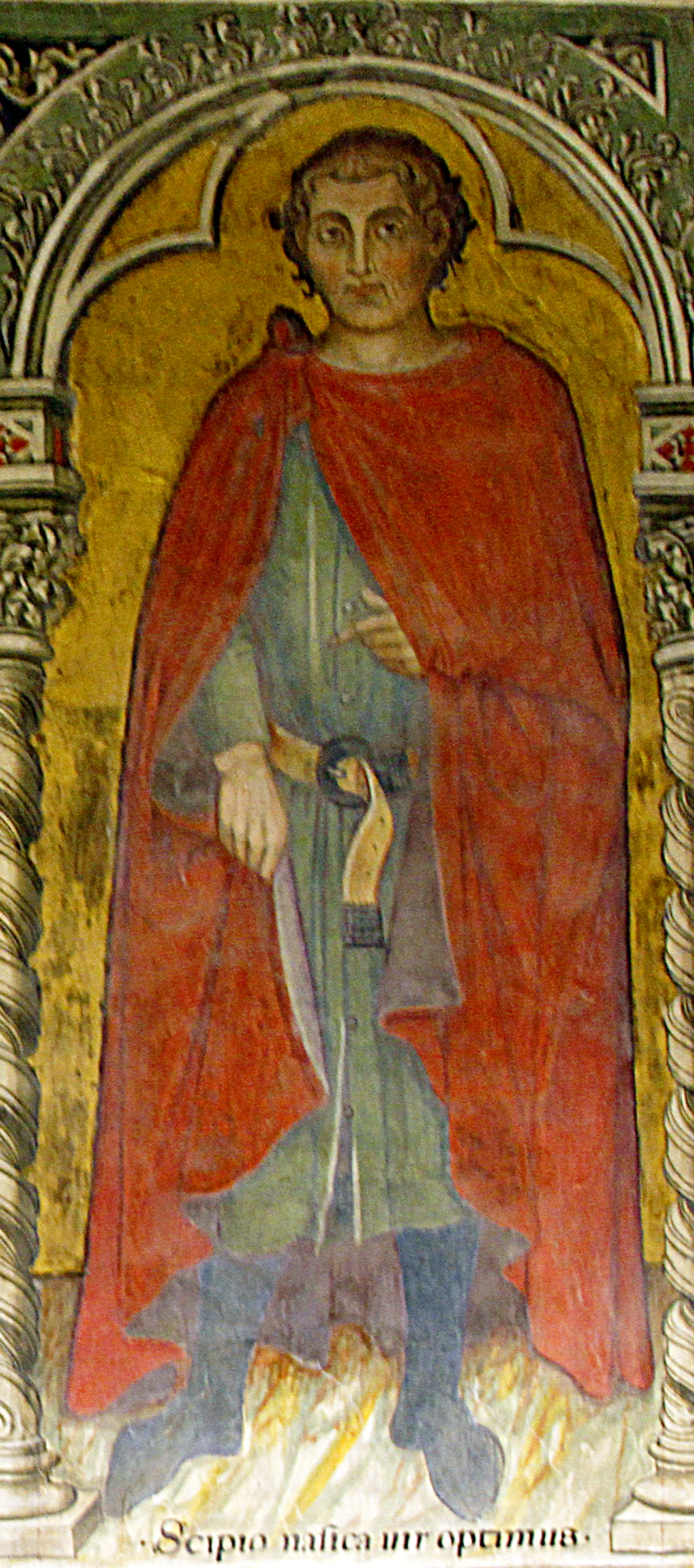
Scipio Nasica. Fresco by Taddeo di Bartolo, Palazzo Pubblico in Siena.

Publius Cornelius Scipio Nasica (born 227 BC; fl. 204 – 171 BC) (Nasica meaning "pointed nose") was a consul of ancient Rome in 191 BC. He was a son of Gnaeus Cornelius Scipio Calvus.

At the request of the Senate, he journeyed with the Roman matrons to receive the statue of Magna Mater in 204 when it arrived from Anatolia at Ostia. According to Livy and Ovid's Fasti we are told that he was chosen for this duty because he was the best of the Roman community. He was later aedile in 197. As praetor in Hispania Ulterior (194), he defeated the Lusitanians at Ilipa, and as consul subjugated the Boii. He was not chosen as censor despite standing in both the elections of 189 and 184, a failure marking the decline of the influence of the Scipiones in Rome. He went on to help found Aquileia in 181, and appears in an inquiry of 171.

This Scipio Nasica was the father of the Scipio Nasica who opposed Cato the Censor for several years on the question of Carthage. Both father and son were distinguished jurists; the father was reportedly given a house in the center of Rome by the Senate to make his advice more accessible to the Senate and people of Rome.

According to Cicero, he was also an acquaintance of the epic poet Ennius.

== See also ==
- Family tree of the Cornelii Scipiones
- Cornelia gens

== Notes ==
Political offices
Preceded by L. Quinctius Flamininus; Gn. Domitius Ahenobarbus	Roman consul 191 BC; With: Manius Acilius Glabrio	Succeeded by L. Cornelius Scipio Asiagenes; Gaius Laelius
