= Fine art =

Art developed primarily for aesthetics

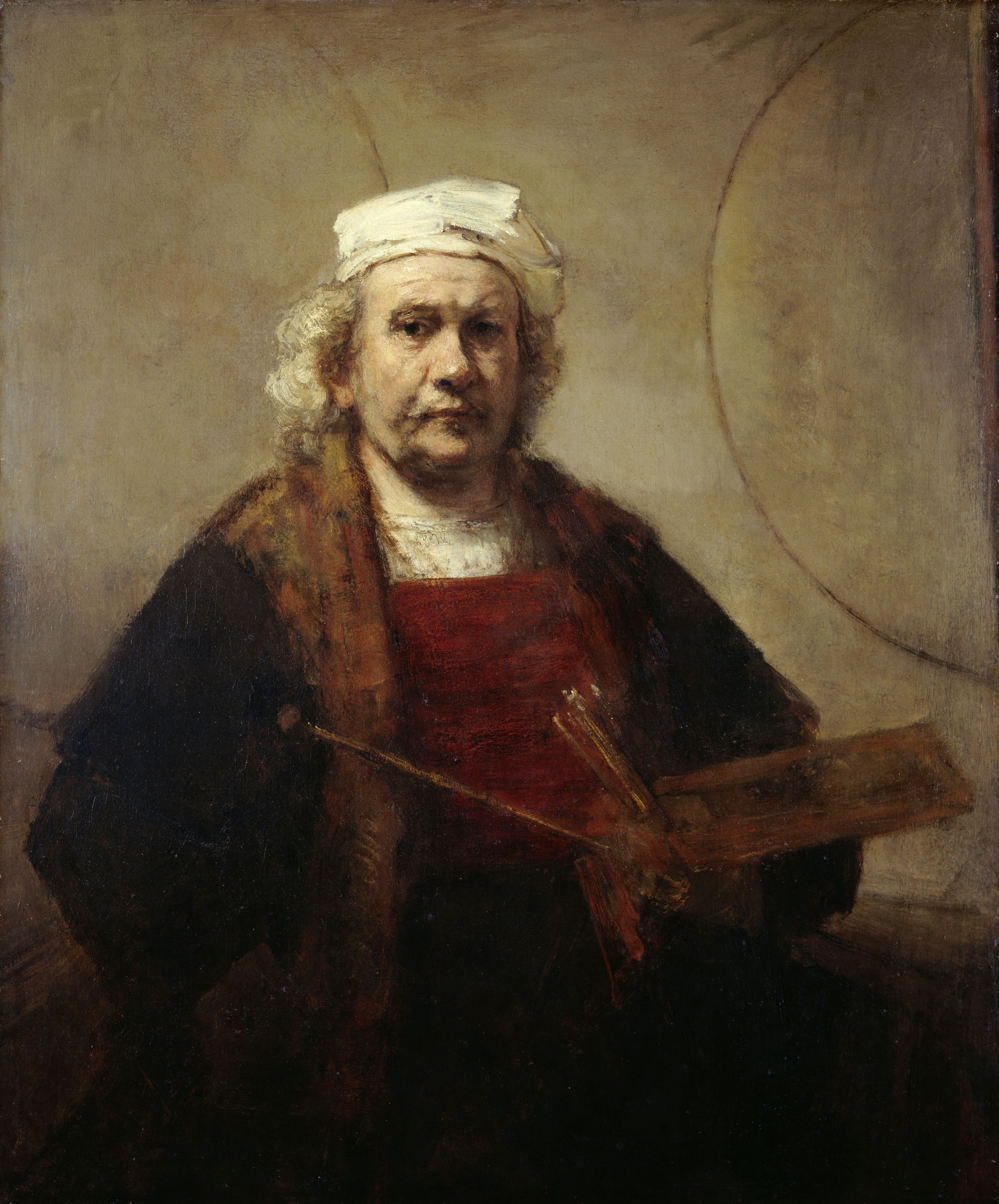
Self-Portrait with Two Circles by Rembrandt, c.1665–1669. Kenwood House, London

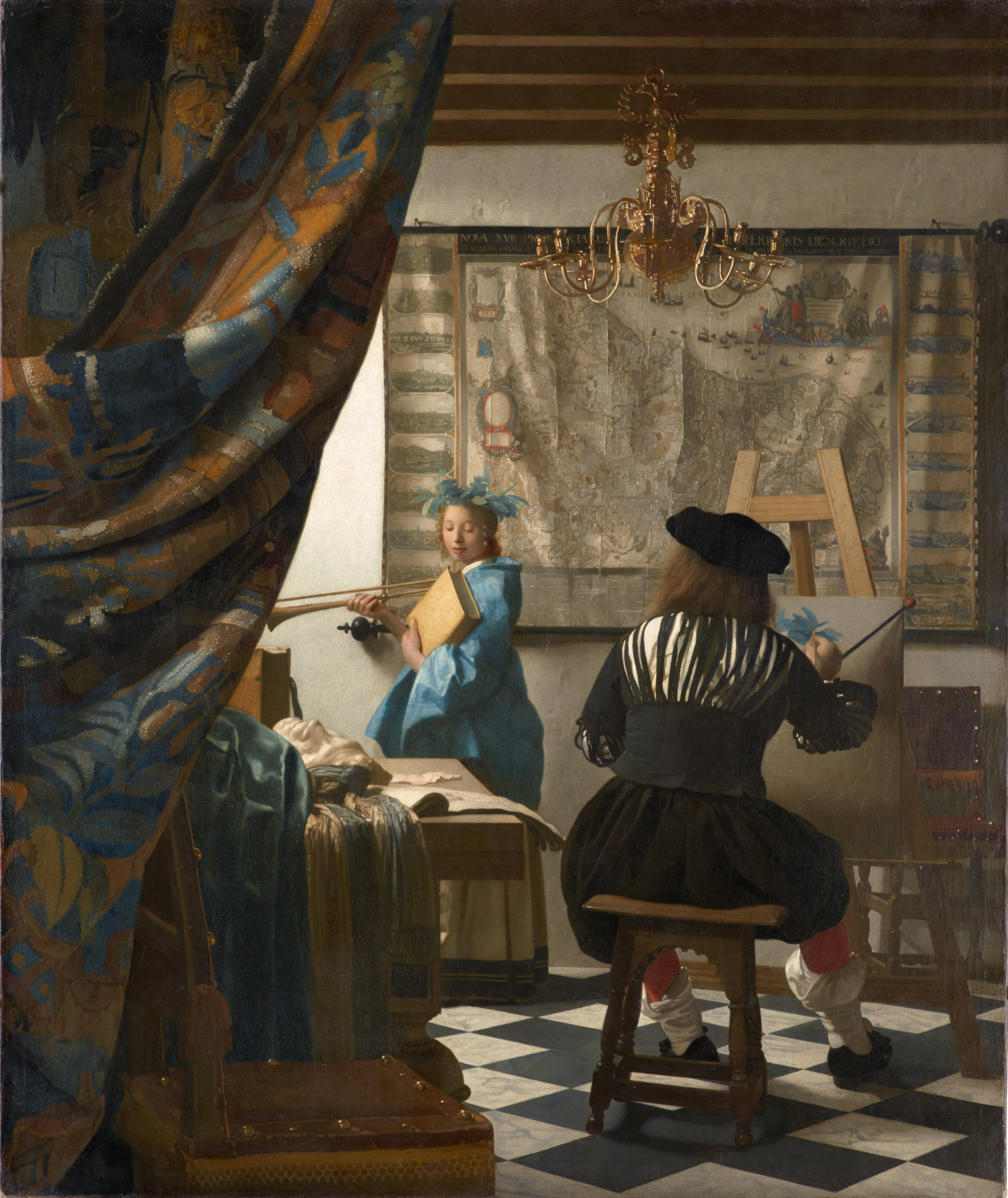
The Art of Painting; by Johannes Vermeer; 1666–1668; oil on canvas; 1.3 × 1.1 m; Kunsthistorisches Museum (Vienna, Austria)

The Tower of Babel; by Pieter Bruegel the Elder; 1563; oil on panel: 1.14 × 1.55 m; Kunsthistorisches Museum

In European academic traditions, fine art (or fine arts) is considered a kind of high art and is made primarily for aesthetics or creative expression, distinguishing it from popular art, decorative art or applied art, which also either serve some practical function (such as pottery or most metalwork) or is generally of limited artistic quality in order to appeal to the masses. In the aesthetic theories developed in the Italian Renaissance, the highest art was that which allowed the full expression and display of the artist's imagination, unrestricted by any of the practical considerations involved in, say, making and decorating a teapot. It was also considered important that making the artwork did not involve dividing the work between different individuals with specialized skills, as might be necessary with a piece of furniture, for example. Even within the fine arts, there was a hierarchy of genres based on the amount of creative imagination required, with history painting placed higher than still life.

Historically, the five main fine arts were painting, sculpture, architecture, music, and poetry. Other "minor or subsidiary arts" were also included, especially performing arts such as theatre and dance, which were counted as "among the most ancient and universal." In practice, outside formal education, the concept is typically only applied to the visual arts. The old master print and drawing were included as related forms to painting, just as prose forms of literature were to poetry. Today, the range of what would be considered fine arts (in so far as the term remains in use) commonly includes additional modern forms, such as film, photography, and video production and editing, as well as traditional forms made in a fine art setting, such as studio pottery and studio glass, with equivalents in other materials.

One definition of fine art is "a visual art considered to have been created primarily for aesthetic and intellectual purposes and judged for its beauty and meaningfulness, specifically, painting, sculpture, drawing, watercolor, graphics, and architecture." In that sense, there are conceptual differences between the fine arts and the decorative arts or applied arts (these two terms covering largely the same media). As far as the consumer of the art was concerned, the perception of aesthetic qualities required a refined judgment usually referred to as having good taste, which differentiated fine art from popular art and entertainment.

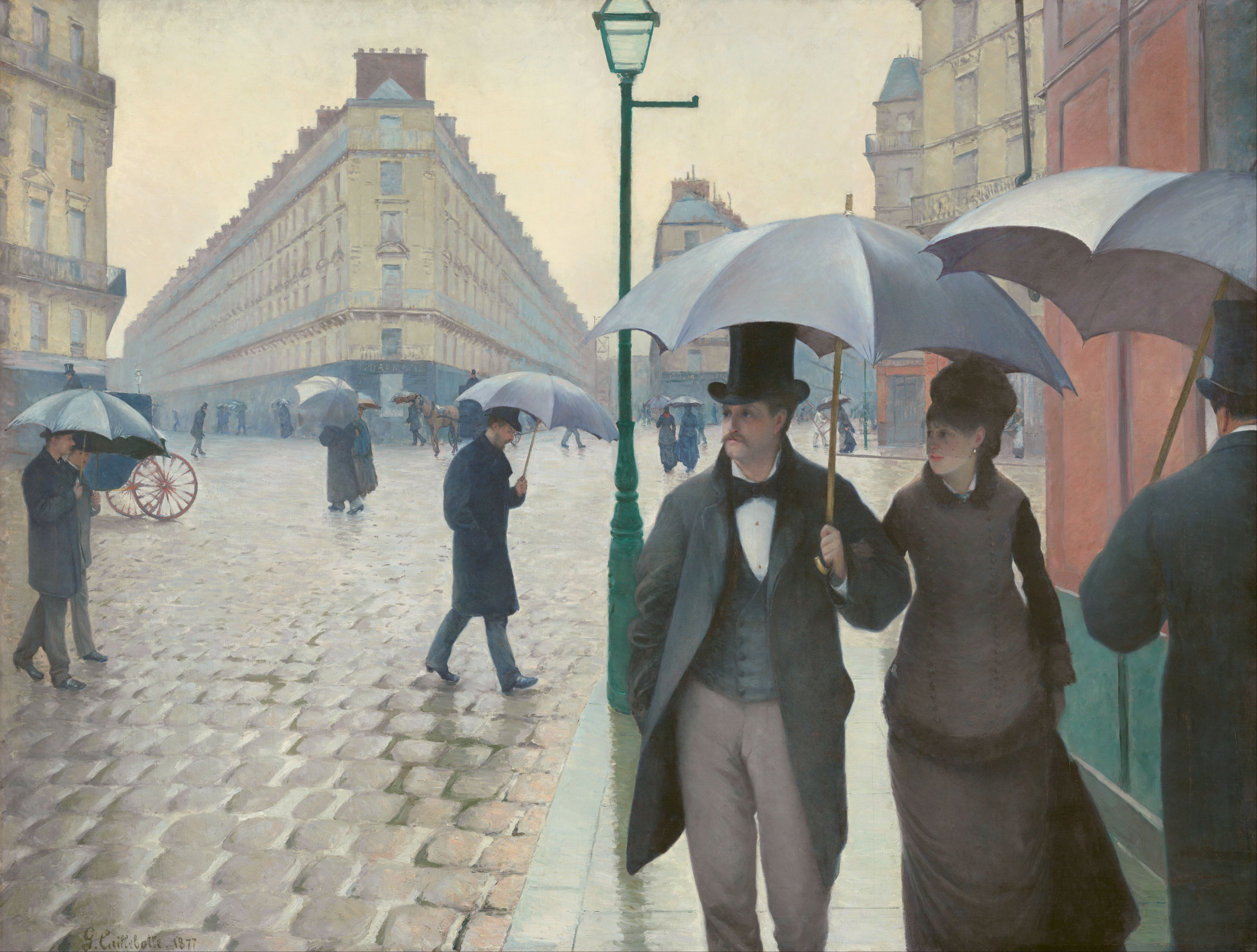
Paris Street; Rainy Day; by Gustave Caillebotte; 1877; oil on canvas; 2.12 × 2.76 m; Art Institute of Chicago (US)

The word "fine" does not so much denote the quality of the artwork in question, but the purity of the discipline according to traditional European canons. Except in the case of architecture, where a practical utility was accepted, this definition originally excluded the "useful" applied or decorative arts, and the products of what were regarded as crafts. In contemporary practice, these distinctions and restrictions have become essentially meaningless, as the concept or intention of the artist is given primacy, regardless of the means through which it is expressed.

The term is typically only used for Western art from the Renaissance onwards, although similar genre distinctions can apply to the art of other cultures, especially those of East Asia. The set of "fine arts" are sometimes also called the "major arts", with "minor arts" equating to the decorative arts. This would typically be for medieval and ancient art.

== Origins, history and development ==
According to some writers, the concept of a distinct category of fine art is an invention of the early modern period in the West. Larry Shiner in his The Invention of Art: A Cultural History (2003) locates the invention in the 18th century: "There was a traditional "system of the arts" in the West before the eighteenth century. (Other traditional cultures still have a similar system.) In that system, an artist or artisan was a skilled maker or practitioner, a work of art was the useful product of skilled work, and the appreciation of the arts was integrally connected with their role in the rest of life. "Art", in other words, meant approximately the same thing as the Greek word "techne", or in English "skill", a sense that has survived in phrases like "the art of war", "the art of love", and "the art of medicine". Similar ideas have been expressed by Paul Oskar Kristeller, Pierre Bourdieu, and Terry Eagleton (e.g. The Ideology of the Aesthetic), though the point of invention is often placed earlier, in the Italian Renaissance; Anthony Blunt notes that the term arti di disegno, a similar concept, emerged in Italy in the mid-16th century.

But it can be argued that the classical world, from which very little theoretical writing on art survives, in practice had similar distinctions. The names of artists preserved in literary sources are Greek painters and sculptors, and to a lesser extent the carvers of engraved gems. Several individuals in these groups were very famous, and copied and remembered for centuries after their deaths. The cult of the individual artistic genius, which was an important part of the Renaissance theoretical basis for the distinction between "fine" and other art, drew on classical precedent, especially as recorded by Pliny the Elder. Some other types of object, in particular Ancient Greek pottery, are often signed by their makers or the owner of the workshop, probably partly to advertise their products.

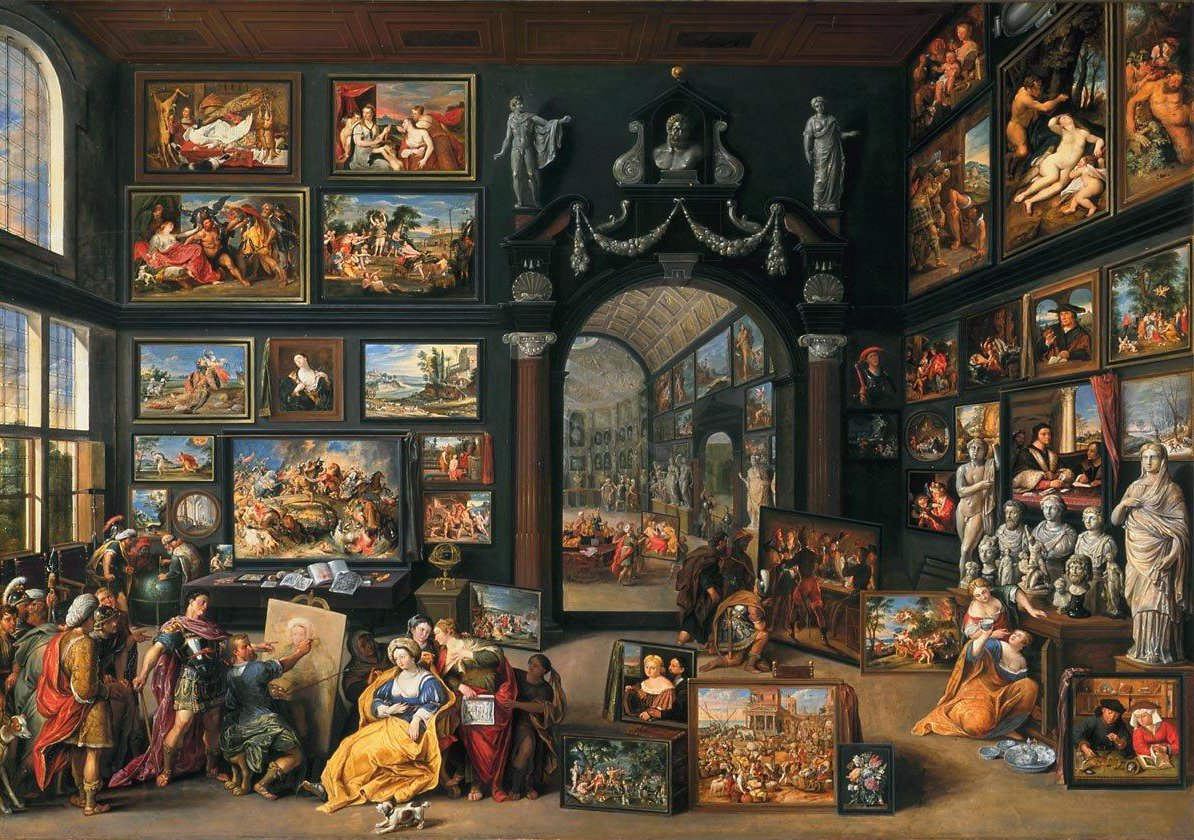
Apelles painting Campaspe, by Willem van Haecht; c. 1630; Mauritshuis

The decline of the concept of "fine art" is dated by George Kubler and others to around 1880. When it "fell out of fashion" as, by about 1900, folk art was also coming to be regarded as significant. Finally, at least in circles interested in art theory, ""fine art" was driven out of use by about 1920 by the exponents of industrial design ... who opposed a double standard of judgment for works of art and for useful objects". This was among theoreticians; it has taken far longer for the art trade and popular opinion to catch up. However, over the same period of the late 19th and early 20th centuries, the movement of prices in the art market was in the opposite direction, with works from the fine arts drawing much further ahead of those from the decorative arts.

In the art trade the term retains some currency for objects from before roughly 1900 and may be used to define the scope of auctions or auction house departments and the like. The term also remains in use in tertiary education, appearing in the names of colleges, faculties, and courses. In the English-speaking world this is mostly in North America, but the same is true of the equivalent terms in other European languages, such as beaux-arts in French or bellas artes in Spanish.

== Cultural perspectives ==
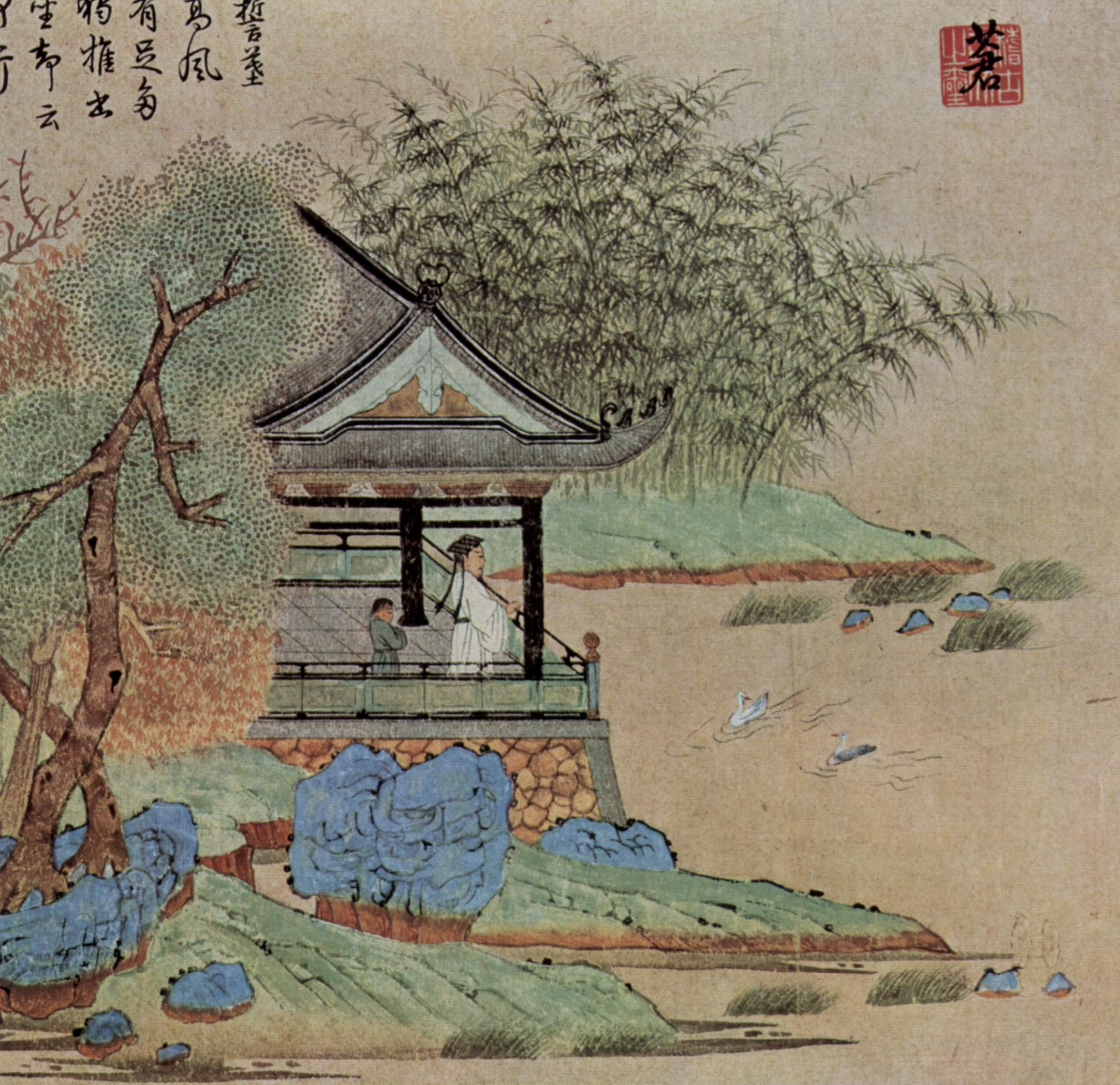
Wang Xizhi watching geese; by Qian Xuan; 1235-before 1307; handscroll (ink, color and gold on paper); 9 1/8 x 36 1/2 in.; Metropolitan Museum of Art

The conceptual separation of arts and decorative arts or crafts that have often dominated in Europe and the US is not shared by all other cultures. But traditional Chinese art had comparable distinctions, distinguishing within Chinese painting between the mostly landscape literati painting of scholar gentlemen and the artisans of the schools of court painting and sculpture. Although high status was also given to many things that would be seen as craft objects in the West, in particular ceramics, jade carving, weaving, and embroidery, this by no means extended to the workers who created these objects, who typically remained even more anonymous than in the West. Similar distinctions were made in Japanese and Korean art. In Islamic art, the highest status was generally given to calligraphy, architects and the painters of Persian miniatures and related traditions, but these were still very often court employees. Typically they also supplied designs for the best Persian carpets, architectural tiling and other decorative media, more consistently than happened in the West.

Latin American art was dominated by European colonialism until the 20th century, when indigenous art began to reassert itself inspired by the Constructivist Movement, which reunited arts with crafts based upon socialist principles. In Africa, Yoruba art often has a political and spiritual function. As with the art of the Chinese, the art of the Yoruba is also often composed of what would ordinarily be considered in the West to be craft production. Some of its most admired manifestations, such as textiles, fall in this category.

== Visual arts ==
=== Two-dimensional works ===
==== Painting and drawing ====
Painting as a fine art means applying paint to a flat surface (as opposed for example to painting a sculpture, or a piece of pottery), typically using several colours. Prehistoric painting that has survived was applied to natural rock surfaces, and wall painting, especially on wet plaster in the fresco technique was a major form until recently. Portable paintings on wood panel or canvas have been the most important in the Western world for several centuries, mostly in tempera or oil painting. Asian painting has more often used paper, with the monochrome ink and wash painting tradition dominant in East Asia. Paintings that are intended to go in a book or album are called "miniatures", whether for a Western illuminated manuscript or in Persian miniature and its Turkish equivalent, or Indian paintings of various types. Watercolour is the western version of painting in paper; forms using gouache, chalk, and similar mediums without brushes are really forms of drawing.

Drawing is one of the major forms of the visual arts, and painters need drawing skills as well. Common instruments include: graphite pencils, pen and ink, inked brushes, wax color pencils, crayons, charcoals, chalk, pastels, markers, stylus, or various metals like silverpoint. There are a number of subcategories of drawing, including cartooning and creating comics.

The Garden of Earthly Delights; by Hieronymus Bosch; c. 1504; oil on panel, Museo del Prado

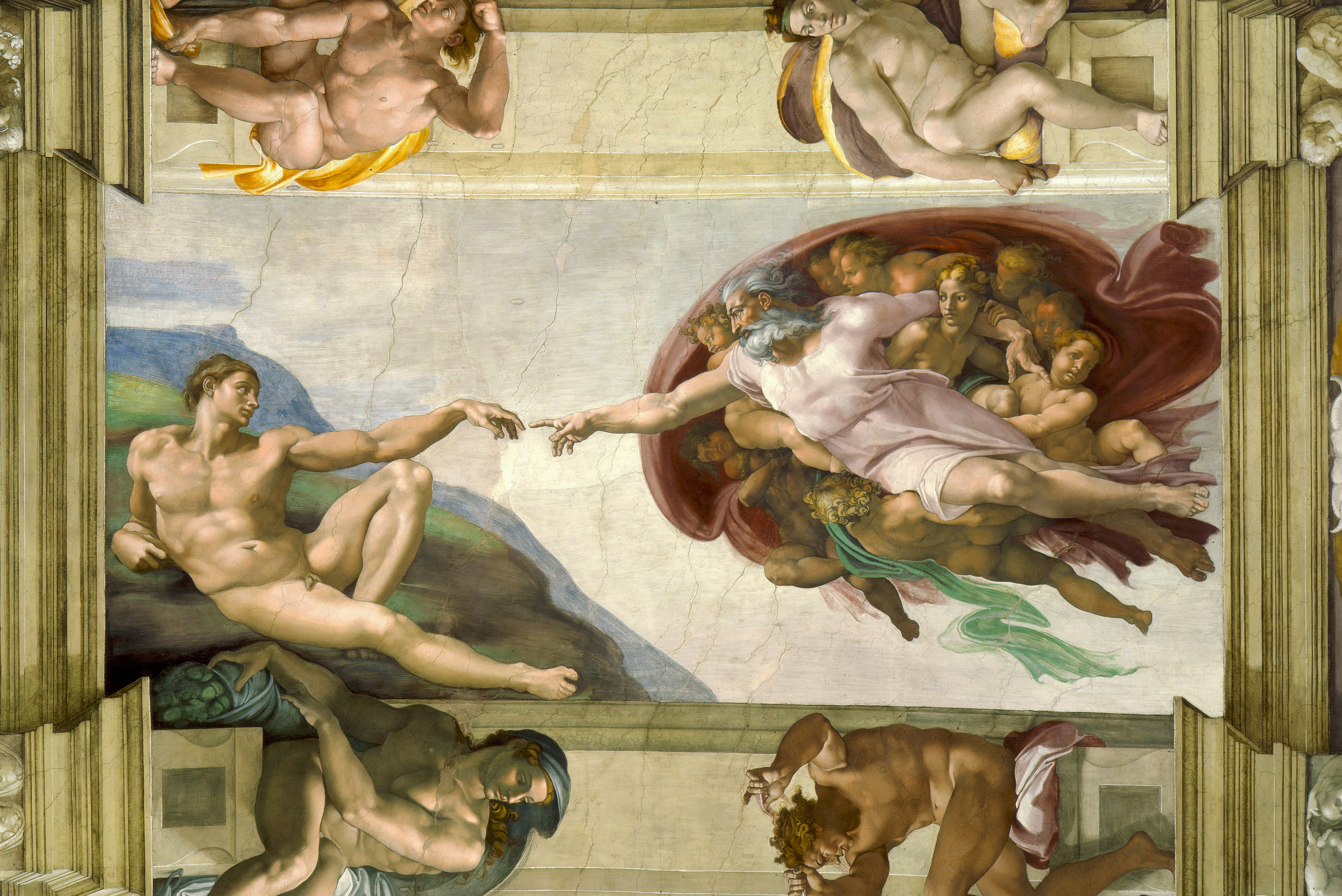
The Creation of Adam; by Michelangelo; 1508–1512; fresco;Sistine Chapel

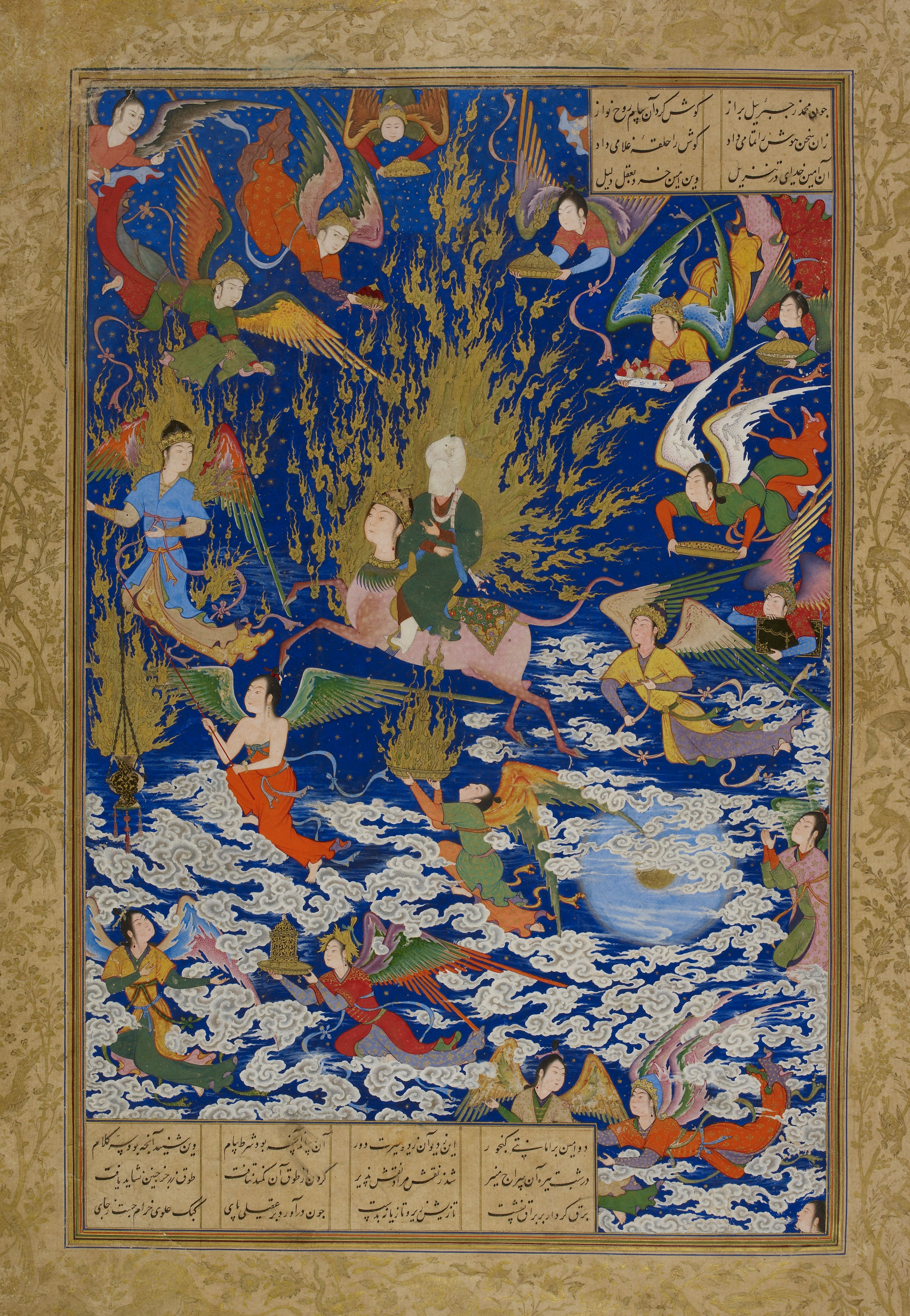
Persian miniature of the Mi'raj of the Prophet by Sultan Mohammed, 1539–1543; British Library

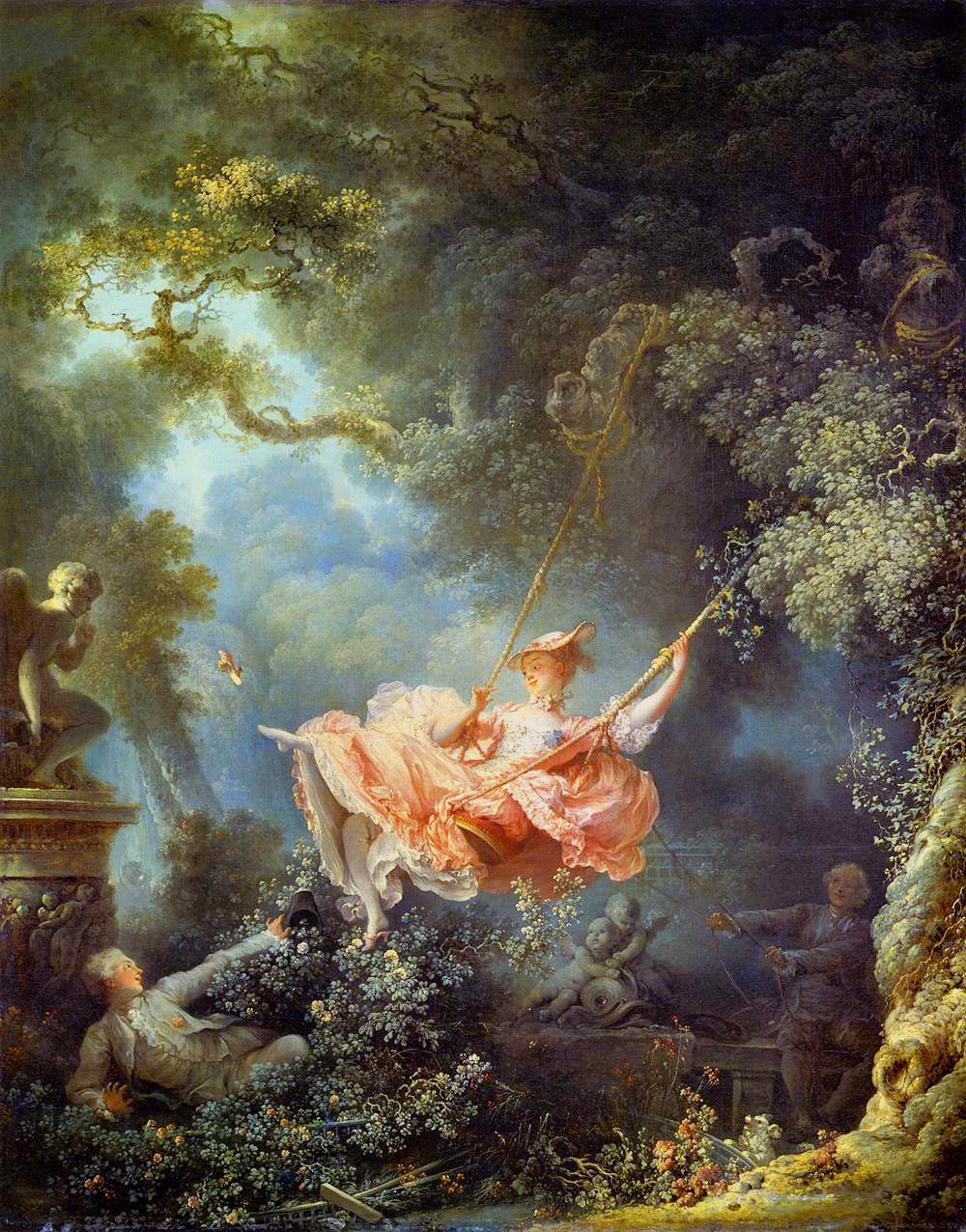
The Swing; by Jean-Honoré Fragonard; 1767–1768; oil on canvas; Wallace Collection

==== Mosaics ====
Mosaics are images formed with small pieces of stone or glass, called tesserae. They can be decorative or functional. An artist who designs and makes mosaics is called a mosaic artist or a mosaicist. Ancient Greeks and Romans created realistic mosaics. Mythological subjects, or scenes of hunting or other pursuits of the wealthy, were popular as the centrepieces of a larger geometric design, with strongly emphasized borders. Early Christian basilicas from the 4th century onwards were decorated with wall and ceiling mosaics. The most famous Byzantine basilicas decorated with mosaics are the Basilica of San Vitale from Ravenna (Italy) and Hagia Sophia from Istanbul (Turkey).

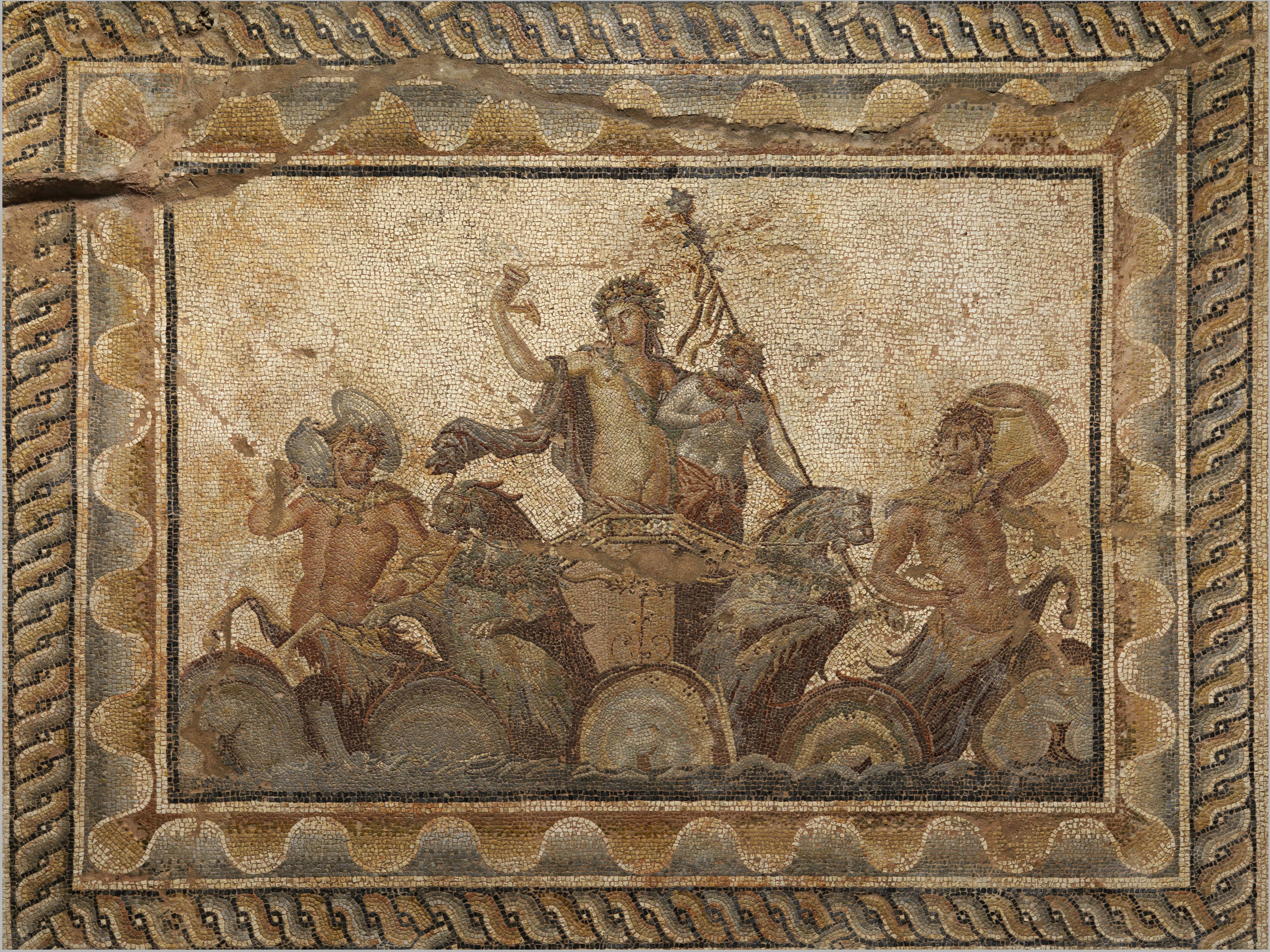
Epiphany of Dionysus; 2nd century AD; from the Villa of Dionysus; Archeological Museum of Dion

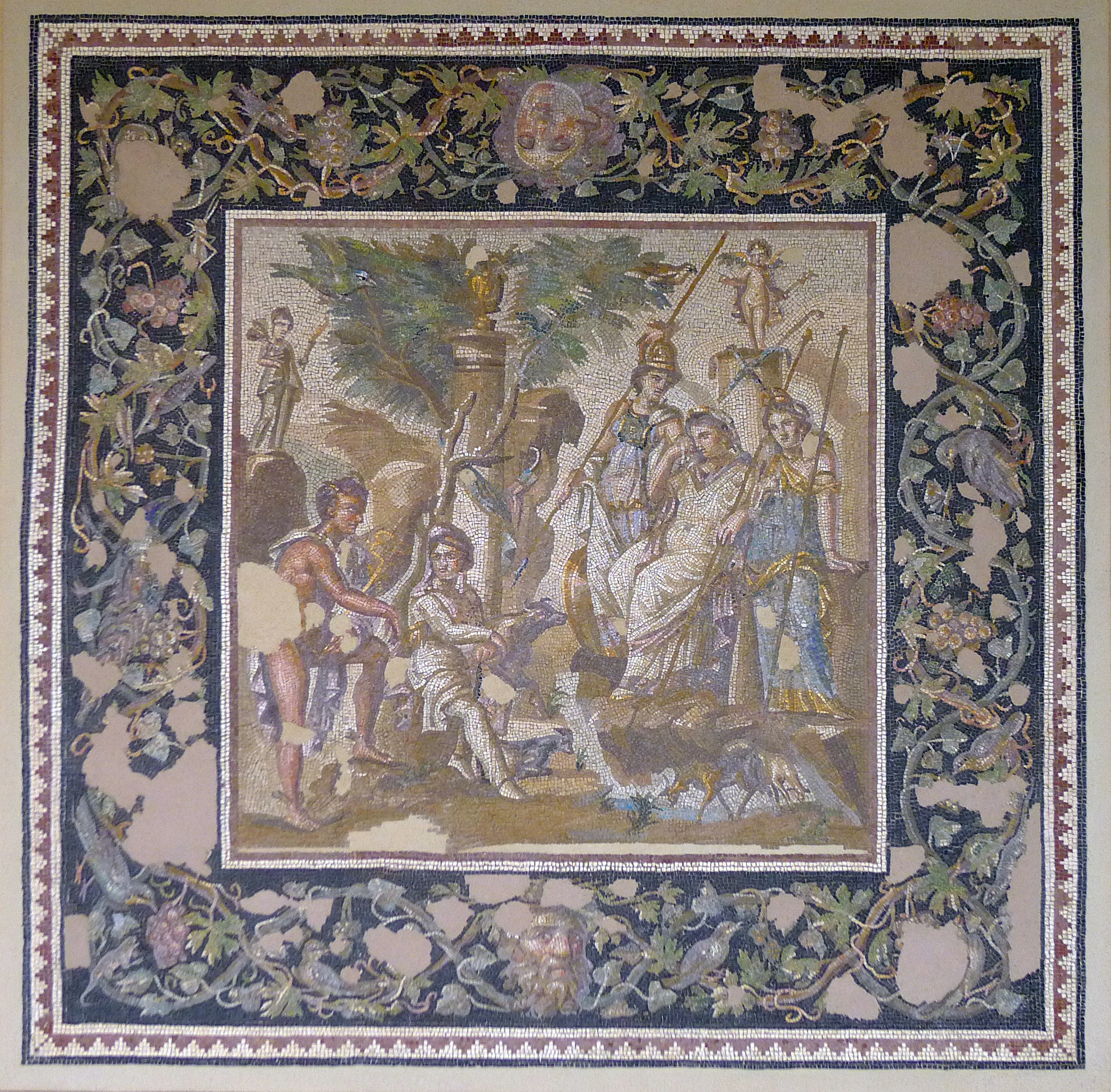
Judgment of Paris; 115–150 AD, from the Atrium House triclinium in Antioch-on-the-Orontes

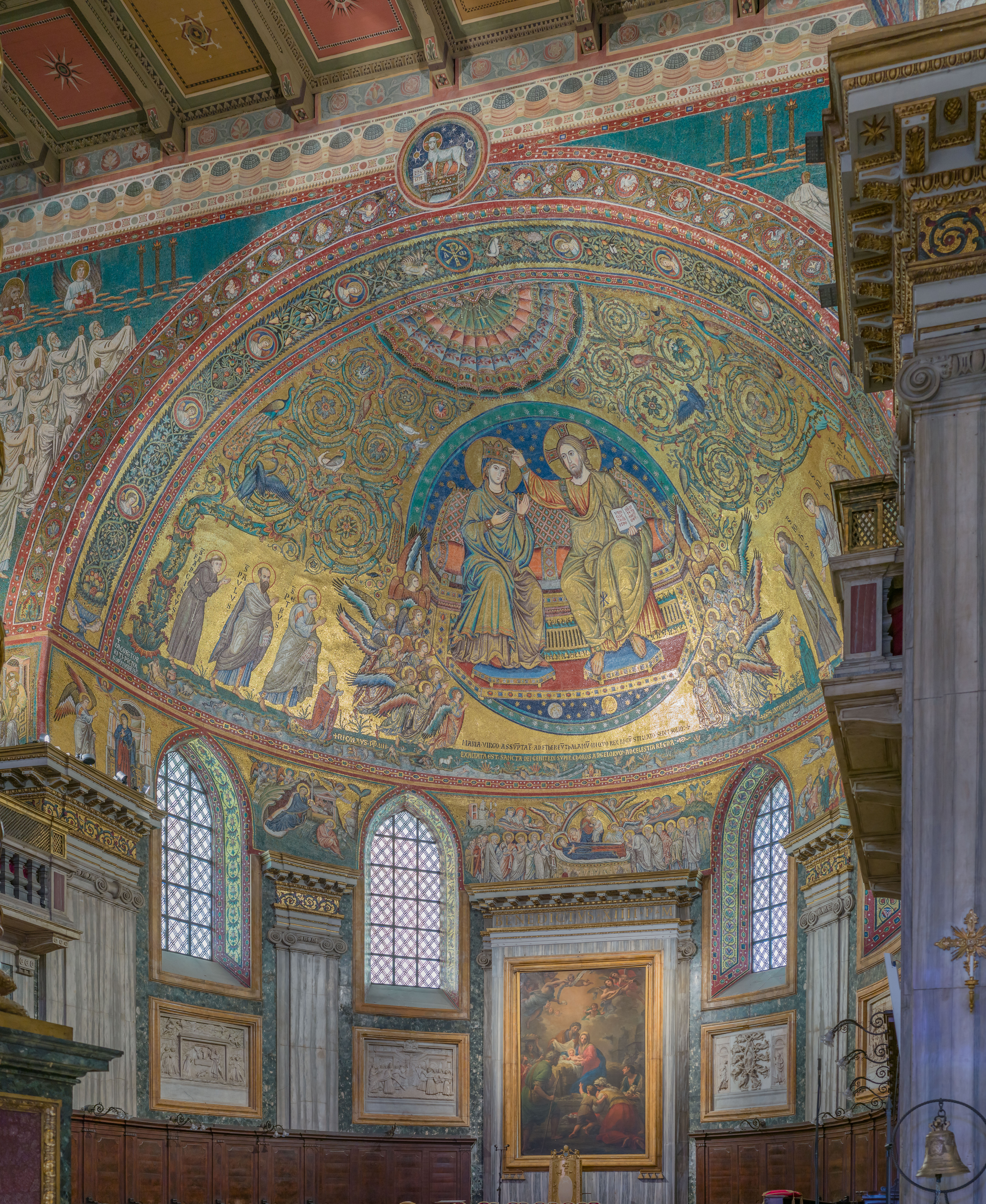
Apse of the Santa Maria Maggiore church in Rome, decorated in the 5th century with this glamorous mosaic

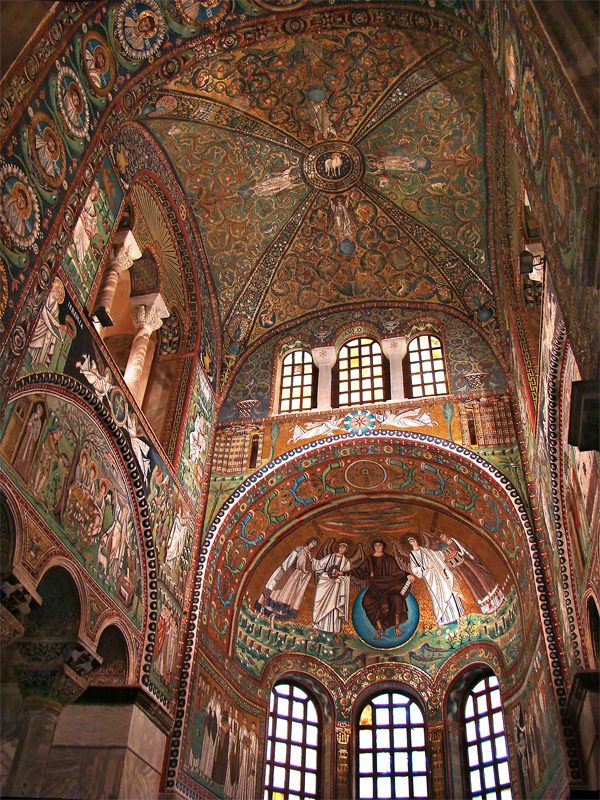
Interior of the Basilica of San Vitale from Ravenna (Italy), decorated with elaborate mosaics

==== Printmaking ====
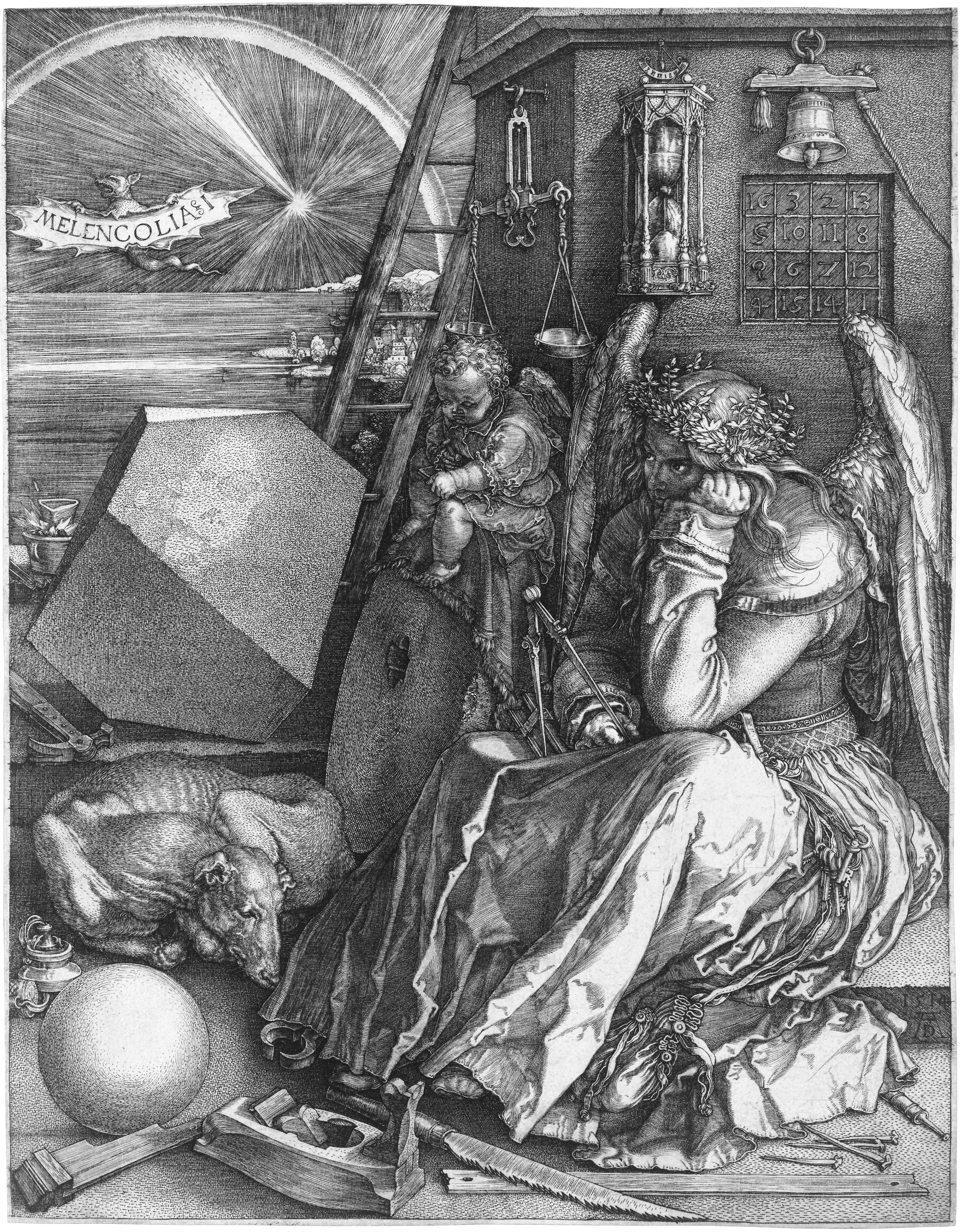
Melencolia I, 1514, engraving by Albrecht Dürer

Printmaking covers the making of images on paper that can be reproduced multiple times by a printing process. It has been an important artistic medium for several centuries, in the West and East Asia. Major historic techniques include engraving, woodcut and etching in the West, and woodblock printing in East Asia, where the Japanese ukiyo-e style is the most important. The 19th-century invention of lithography and then photographic techniques have partly replaced the historic techniques. Older prints can be divided into the fine art Old Master print and popular prints, with book illustrations and other practical images such as maps somewhere in the middle.

Except in the case of monotyping, the process is capable of producing multiples of the same piece, which is called a print. Each print is considered an original, as opposed to a copy. The reasoning behind this is that the print is not a reproduction of another work of art in a different medium – for instance, a painting – but rather an image designed from inception as a print. An individual print is also referred to as an impression. Prints are created from a single original surface, known technically as a matrix. Common types of matrices include: plates of metal, usually copper or zinc for engraving or etching; stone, used for lithography; blocks of wood for woodcuts, linoleum for linocuts and fabric in the case of screen-printing. But there are many other kinds. Multiple nearly identical prints can be called an edition. In modern times each print is often signed and numbered forming a "limited edition". Prints may also be published in book form, as artist's books. A single print could be the product of one or multiple techniques.

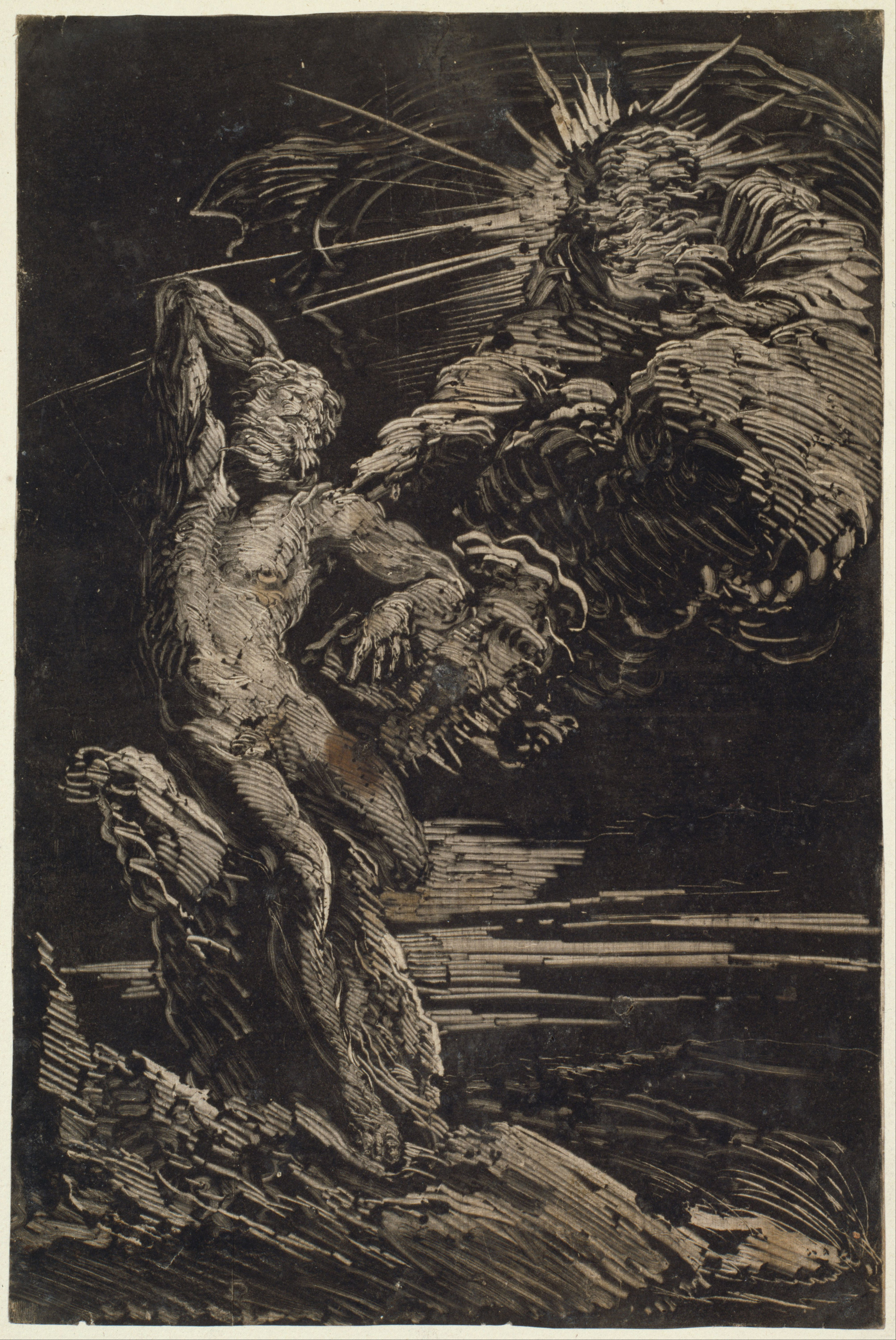
Monotype by the technique's inventor, Giovanni Benedetto Castiglione, The Creation of Adam, c. 1642

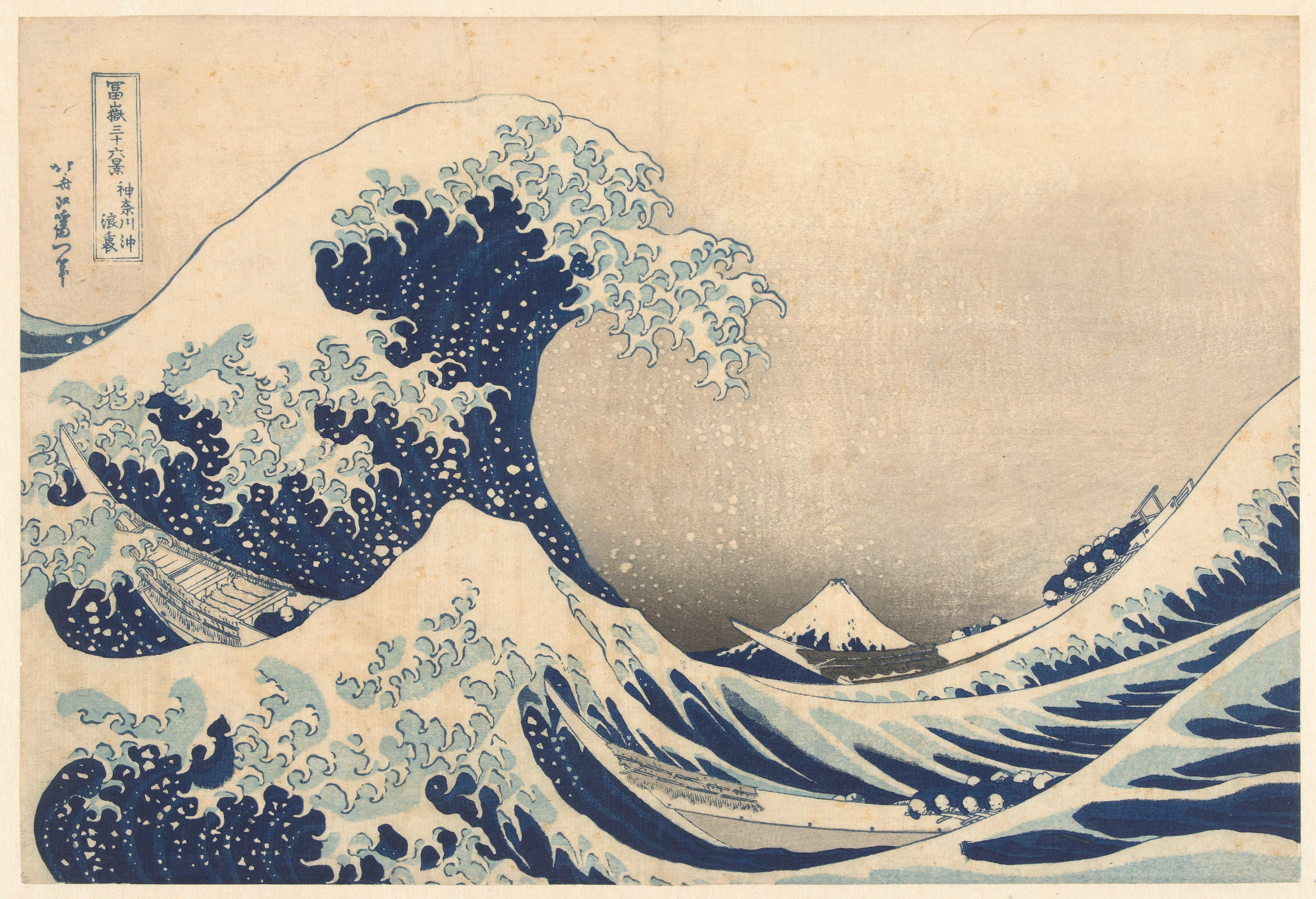
The Great Wave off Kanagawa; 1829–1833; color woodblock print

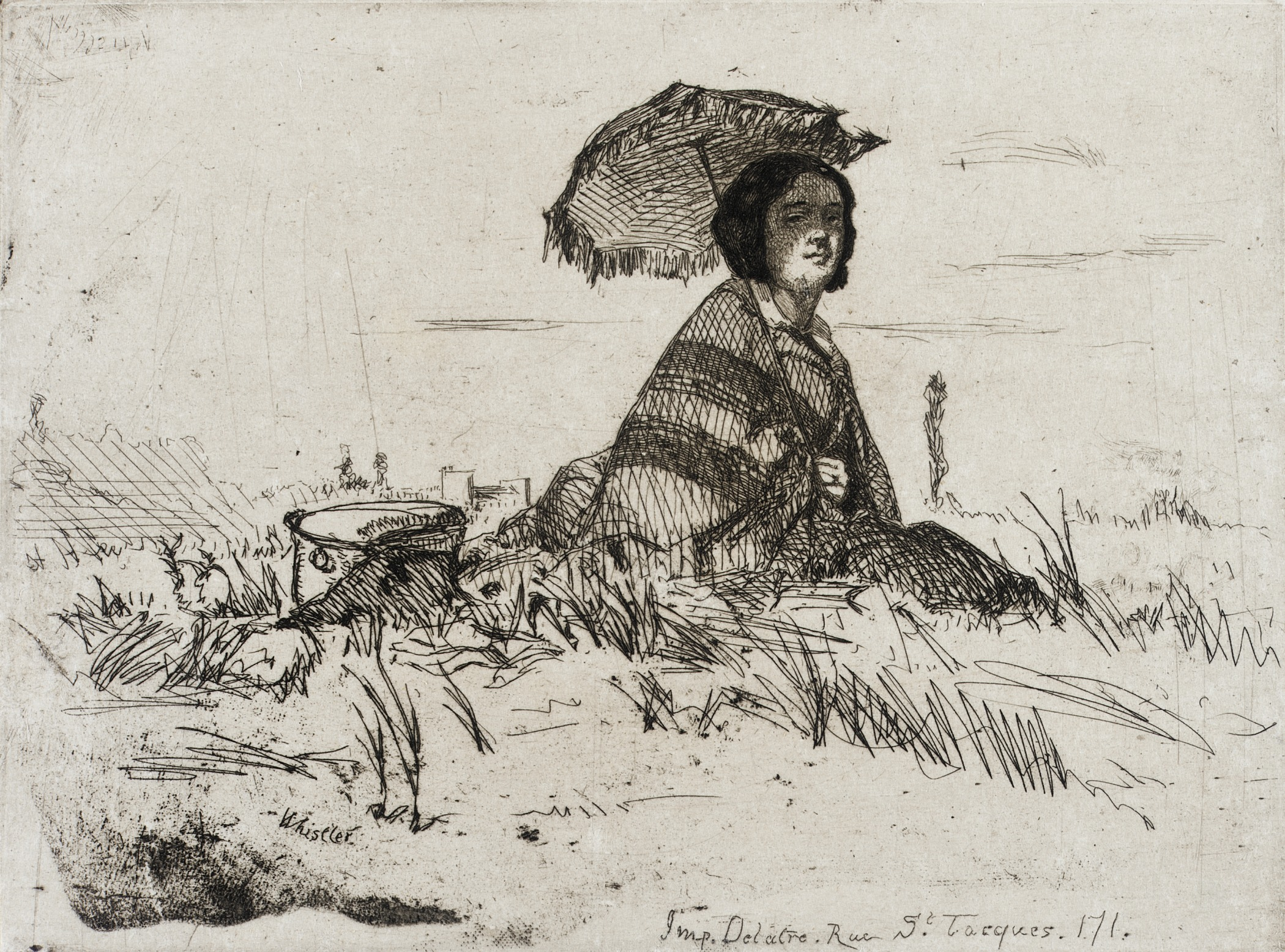
En plein soleil, etching by James Abbott McNeill Whistler, 1858

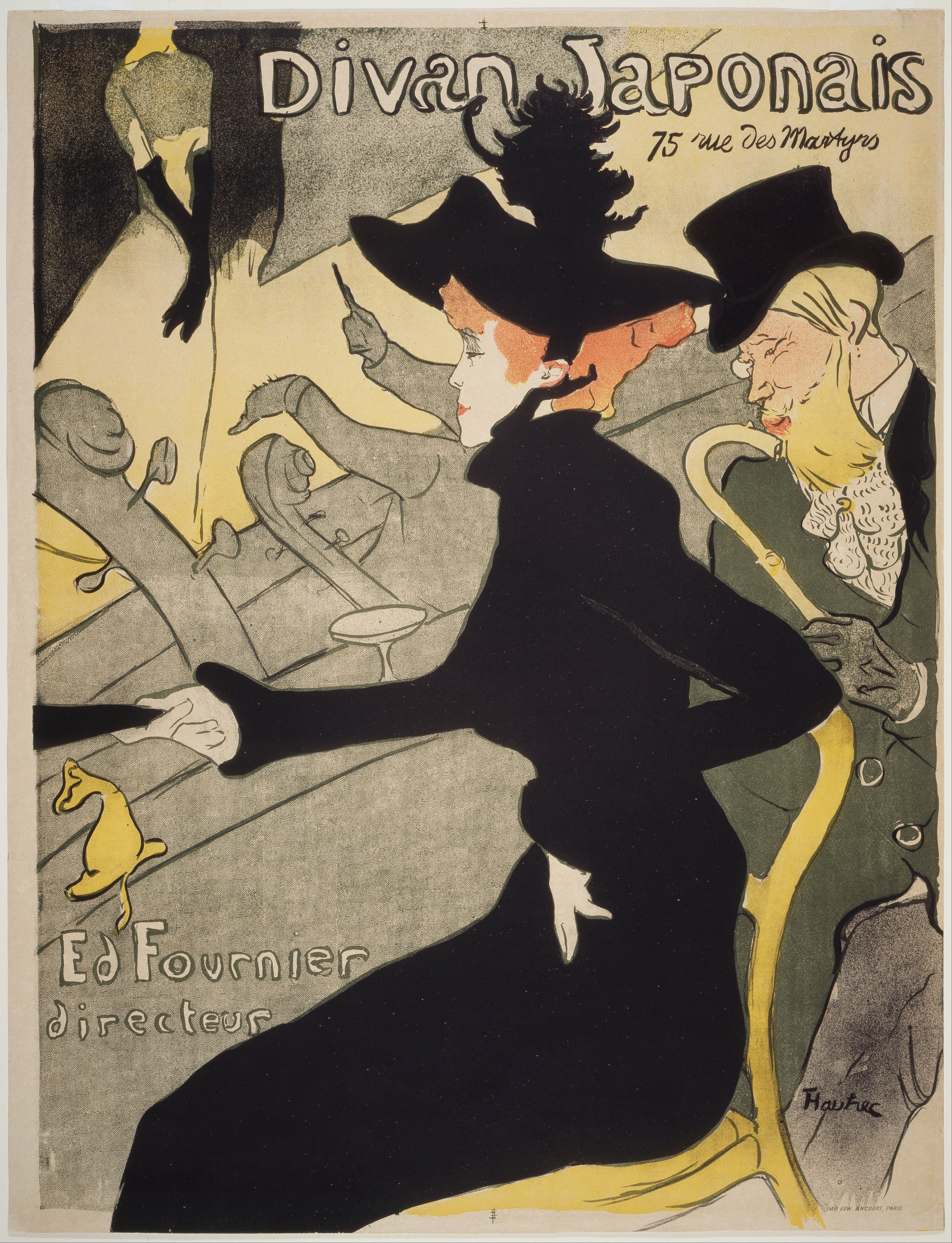
Divan Japonais; by Henri de Toulouse-Lautrec; 1893–1894; Crayon, brush, spatter and transferred screen lithograph.

==== Calligraphy ====
Calligraphy is a type of visual art. A contemporary definition of calligraphic practice is "the art of giving form to signs in an expressive, harmonious and skillful manner". Modern calligraphy ranges from functional hand-lettered inscriptions and designs to fine-art pieces where the abstract expression of the handwritten mark may or may not compromise the legibility of the letters. Classical calligraphy differs from typography and non-classical hand-lettering, though a calligrapher may create all of these; characters are historically disciplined yet fluid and spontaneous, improvised at the moment of writing.

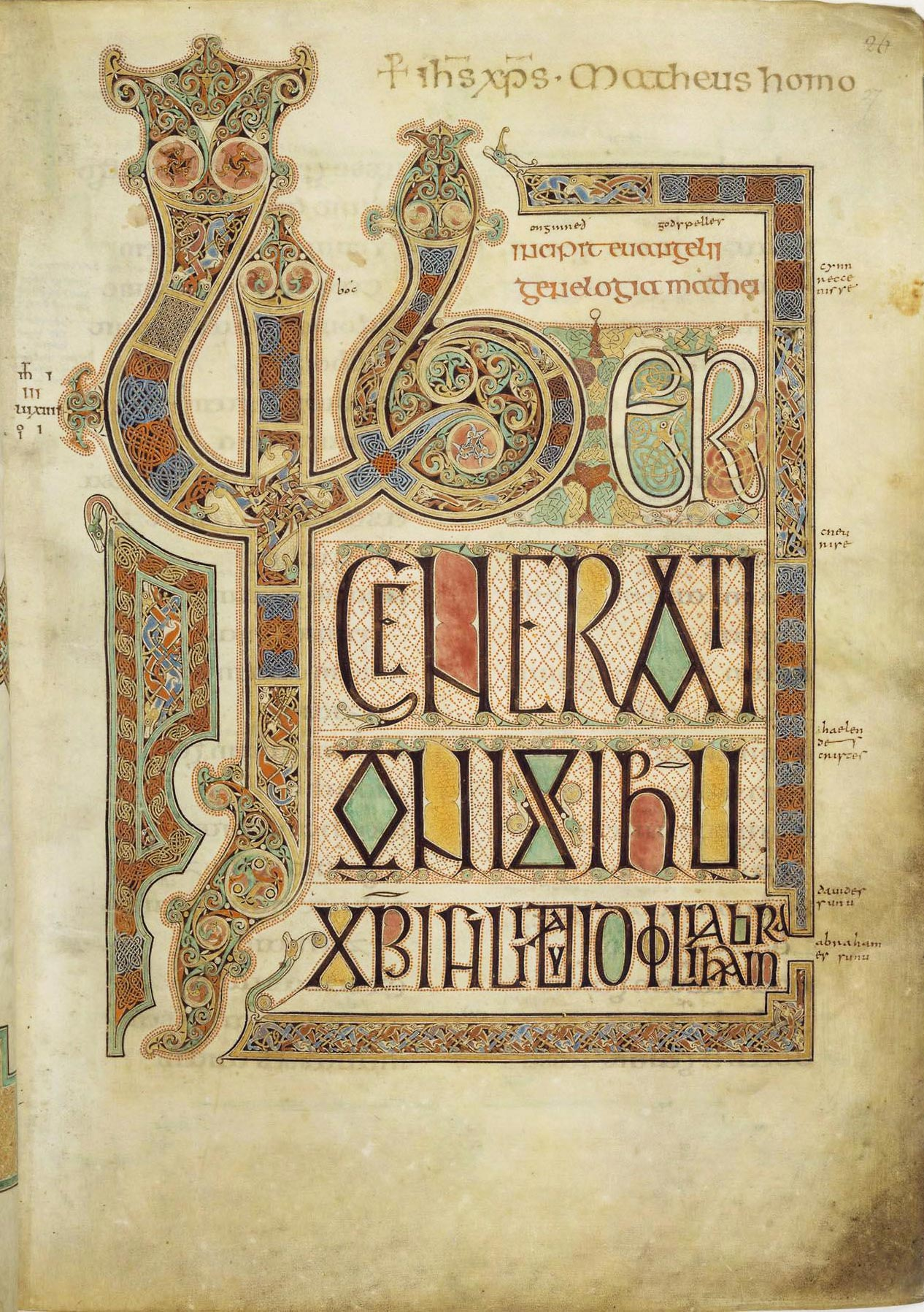
Folio 27r from the Lindisfarne Gospels; 8th century; Cotton Library (British Library, London)

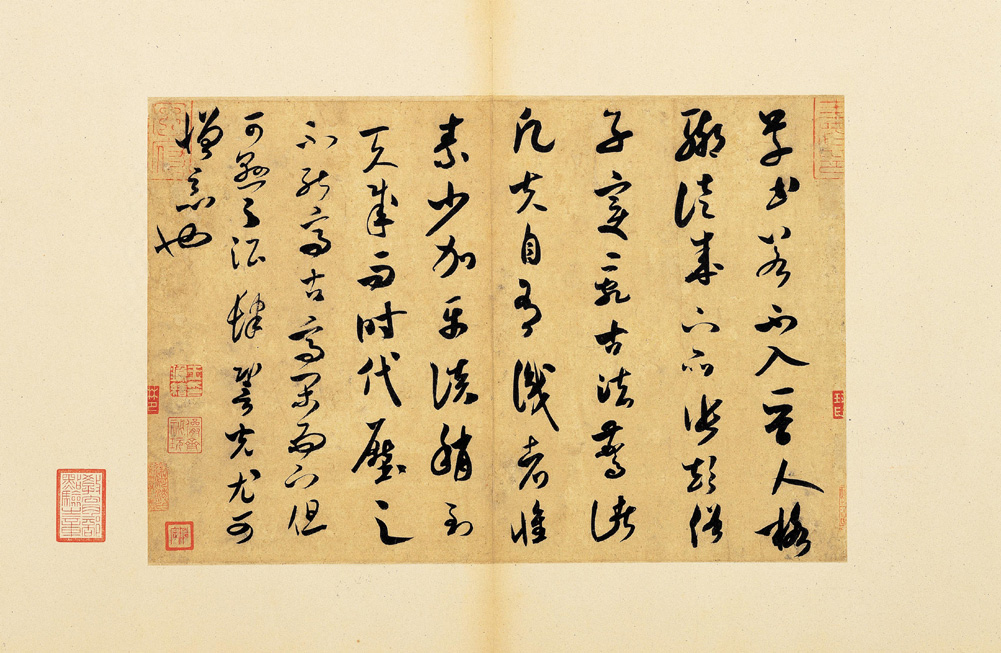
On Calligraphy by Mi Fu, Song dynasty China

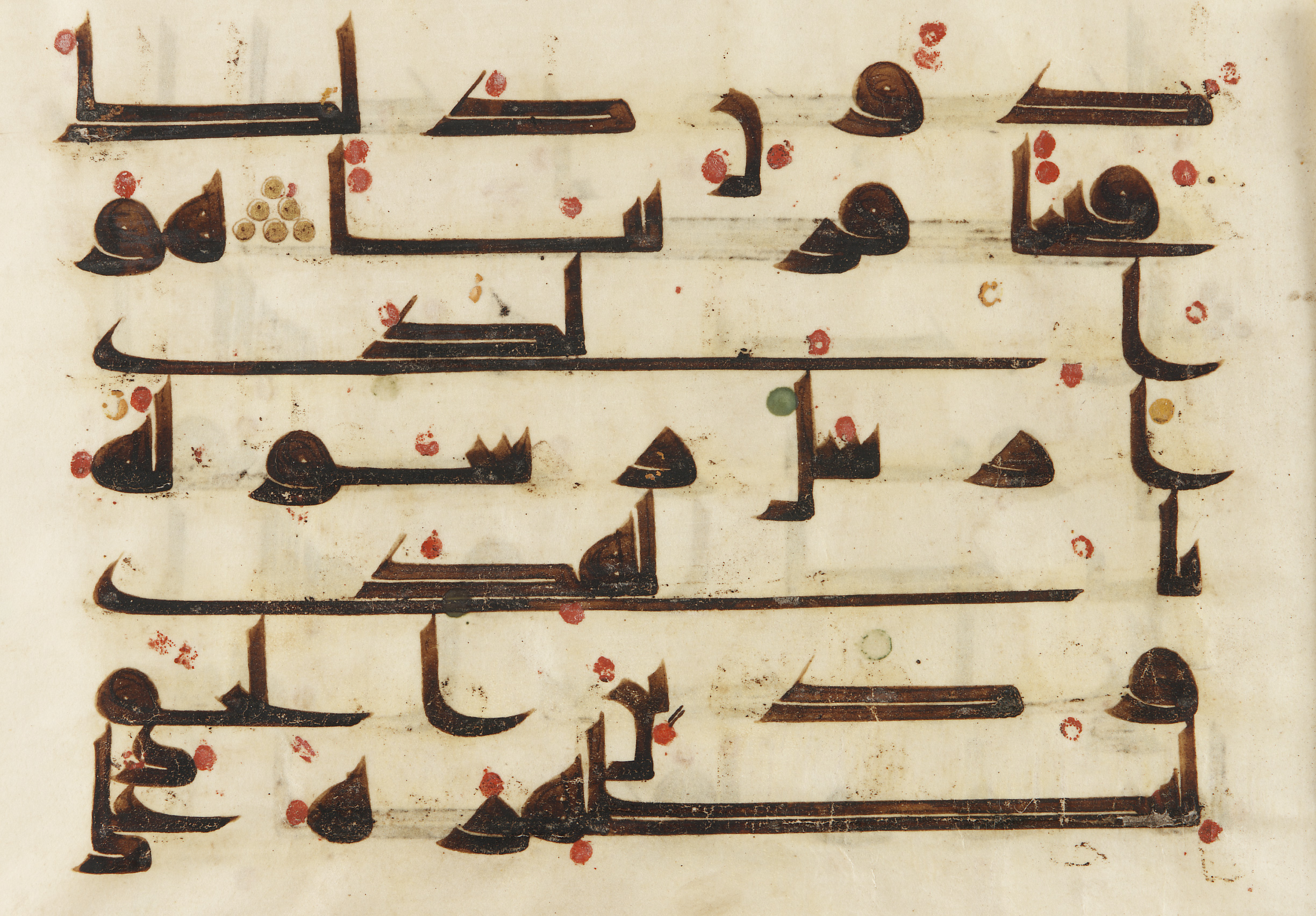
Islamic calligraphy: Folio from a Koran (8–9th century), Abbasid Kufic Calligraphy

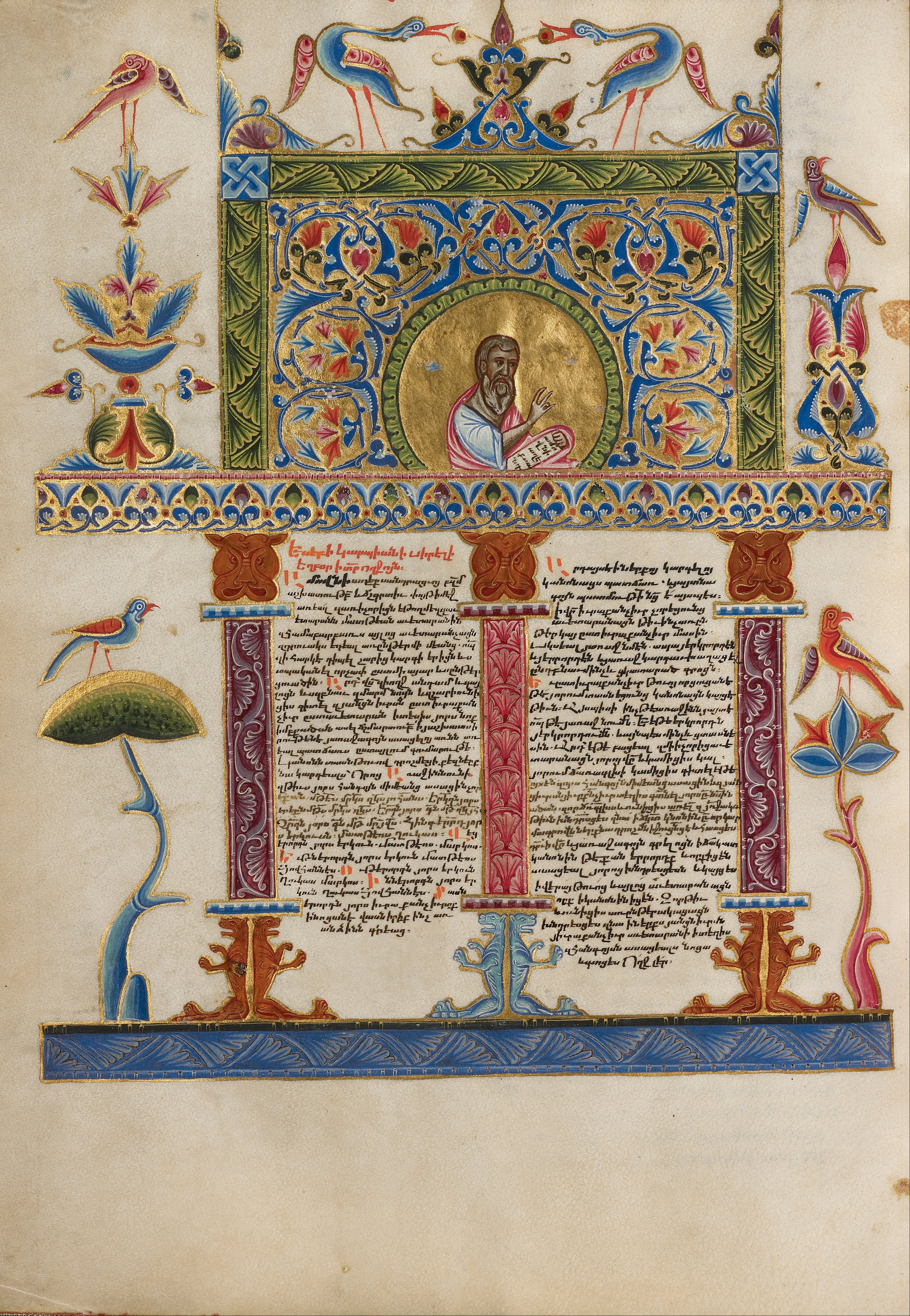
Page of an Armenian illuminated manuscript; 1637–1638; Getty Center (Los Angeles, U.S.)

==== Photography ====
Fine art photography refers to photographs that are created to fulfill the creative vision of the artist. Fine art photography stands in contrast to photojournalism and commercial photography. Photojournalism visually communicates stories and ideas, mainly in print and digital media. Fine art photography is created primarily as an expression of the artist's vision, but has also been important in advancing certain causes. Depiction of nudity has been one of the dominating themes in fine-art photography.

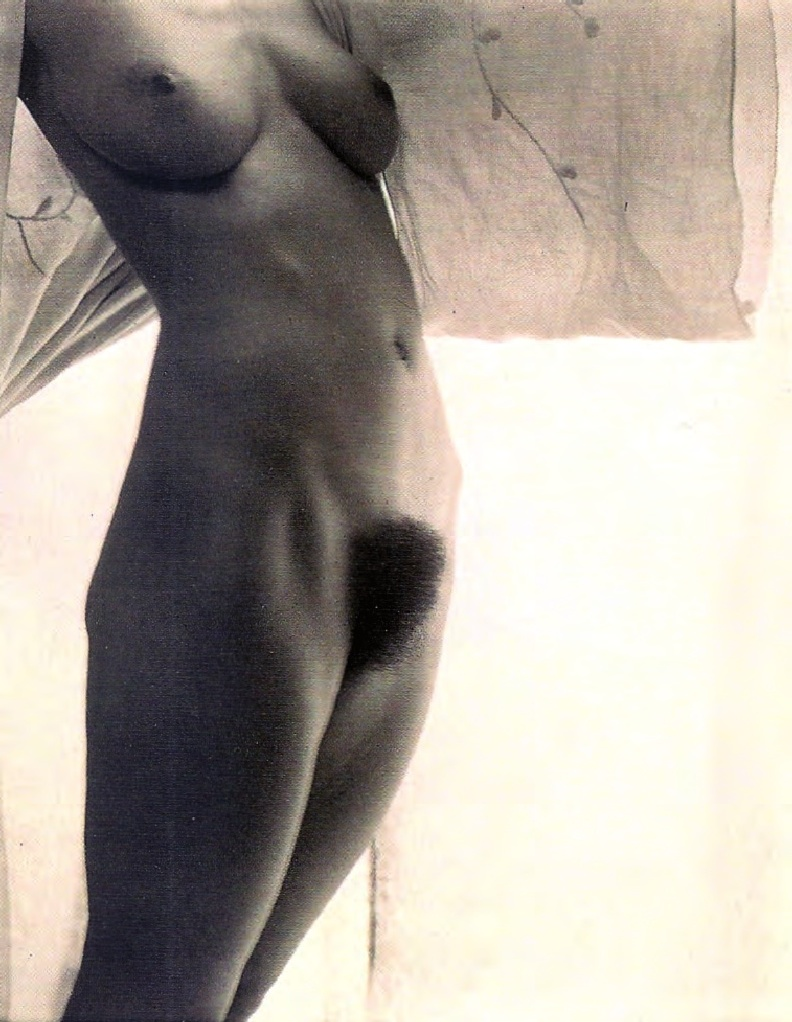
Alfred Stieglitz nude, c. 1916

Man Ray, Lampshade, reproduced in 391, n. 13, July 1920

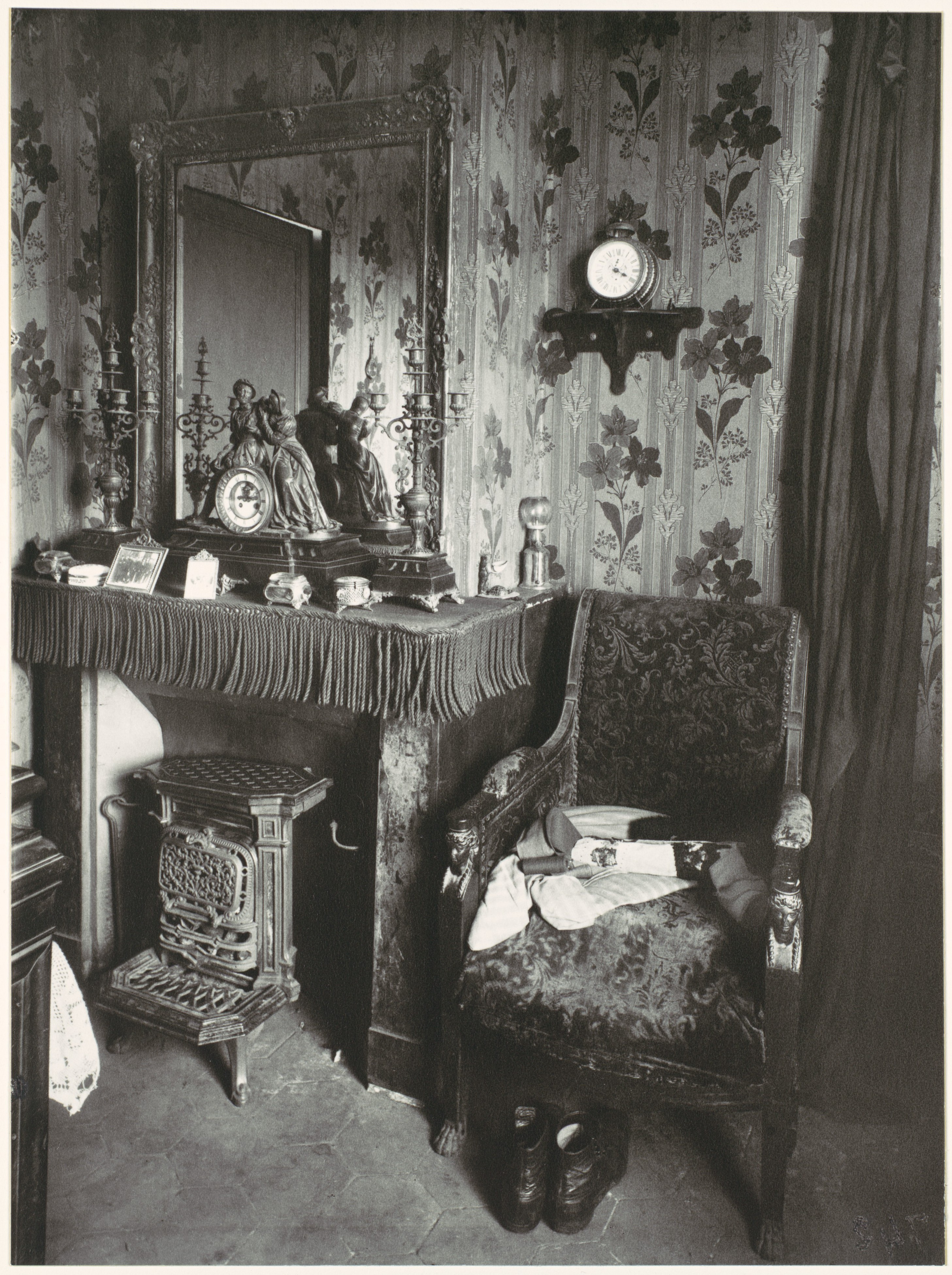
Interior from Paris; taken by Eugène Atget c. 1910

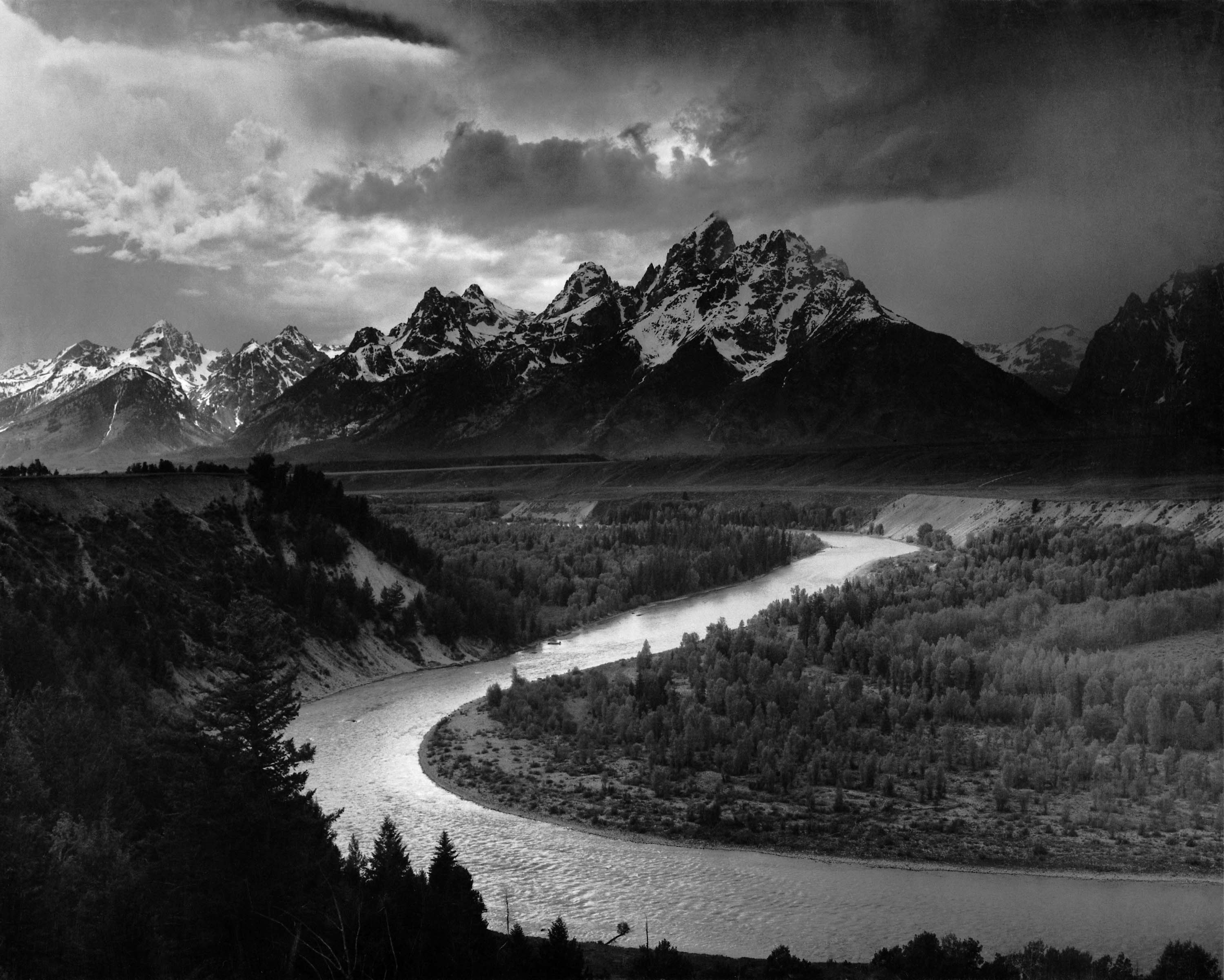
The Tetons and the Snake River; 1942; by Ansel Adams

=== Three-dimensional works ===
==== Architecture ====
Architecture is frequently considered a fine art, especially if its aesthetic components are spotlighted – in contrast to structural-engineering or construction-management components. Architectural works are perceived as cultural and political symbols and works of art. Historical civilizations often are known primarily through their architectural achievements. Such buildings as the pyramids of Egypt and the Roman Colosseum are cultural symbols, and are important links in public consciousness, even when scholars have discovered much about past civilizations through other means. Cities, regions, and cultures continue to identify themselves with, and are known by, their architectural monuments.

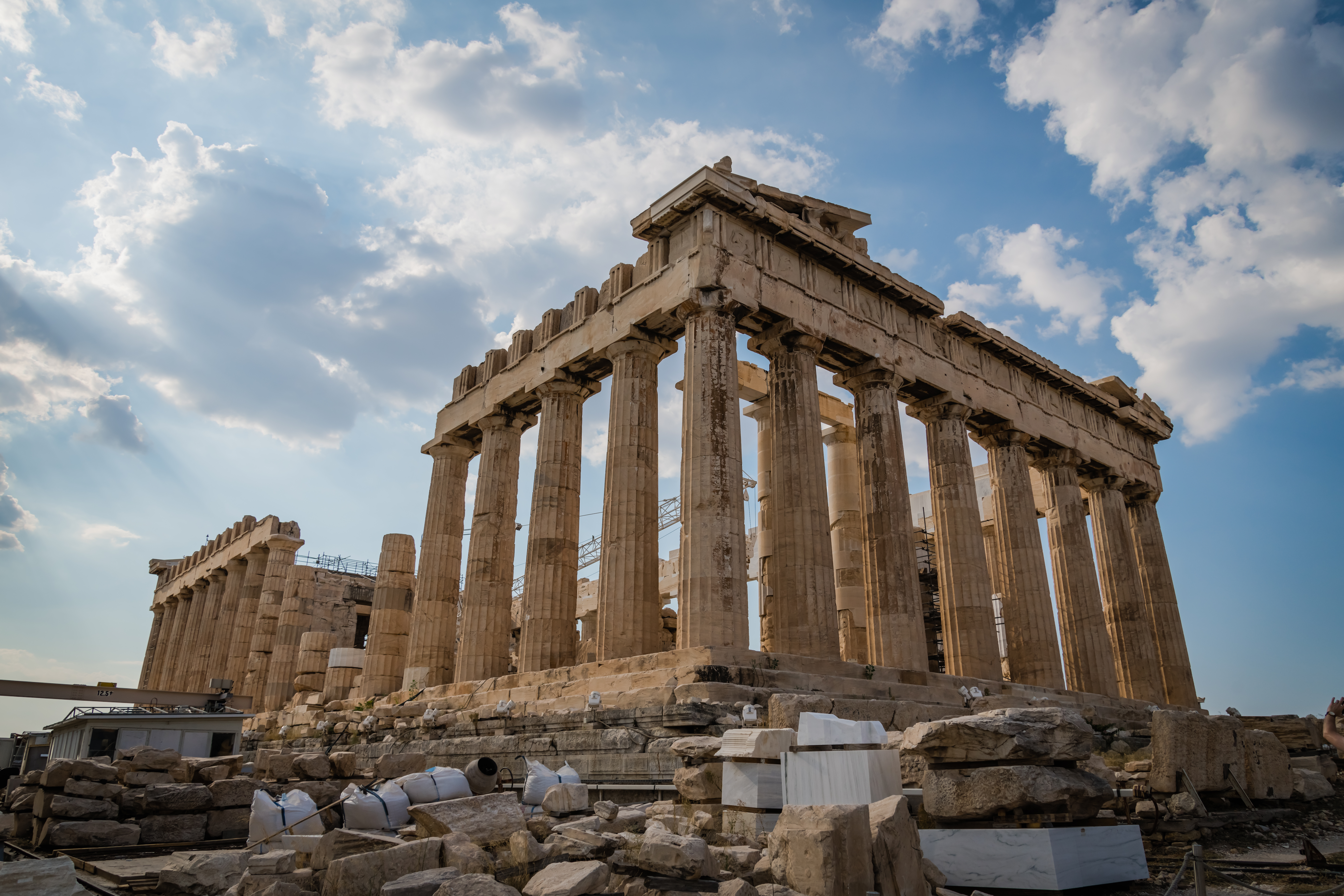
The Parthenon in the Acropolis of Athens, dedicated to the goddess Athena

The Colosseum in Rome

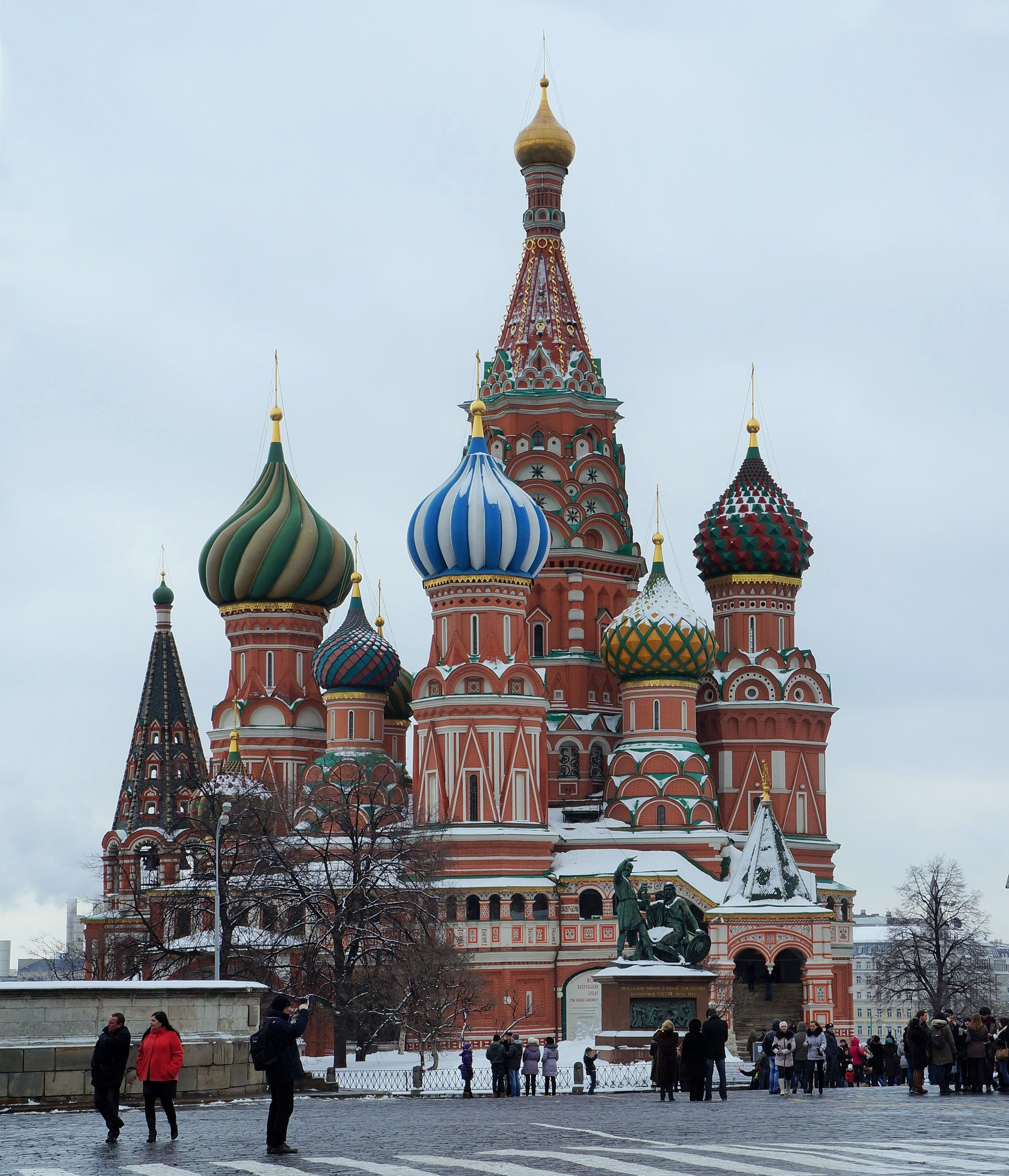
Saint Basil's Cathedral from the Red Square (Moscow)

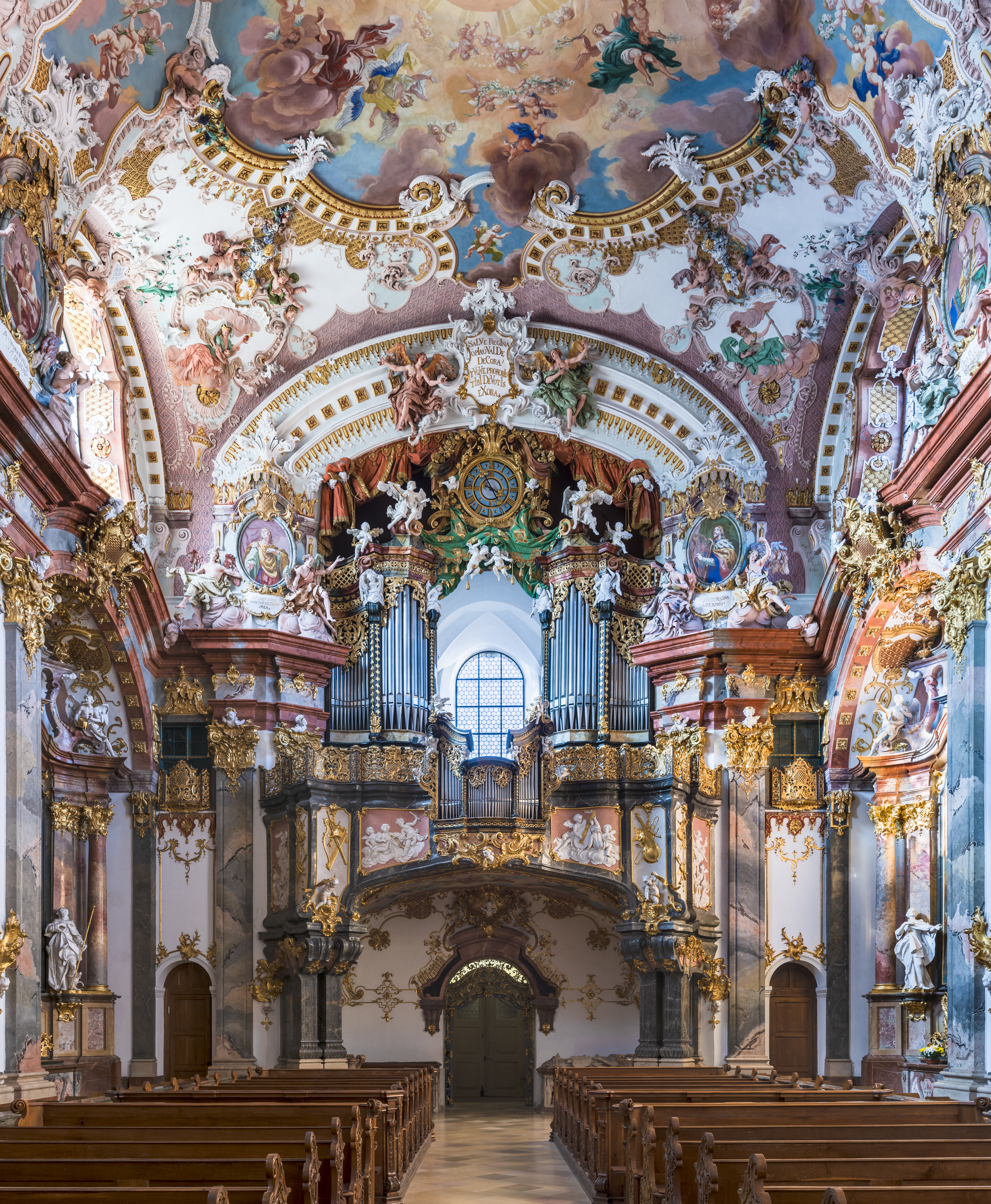
Interior of the Wilhering Abbey (Wilhering, Austria), an example of Rococo architecture

==== Pottery ====
With some modern exceptions, pottery is not considered as fine art, but "fine pottery" remains a valid technical term, especially in archaeology. "Fine wares" are high-quality pottery, often painted, moulded or otherwise decorated, and in many periods distinguished from "coarse wares", which are basic utilitarian pots used by the mass of the population, or in the kitchen rather than for more formal purposes.

Even when, as with porcelain figurines, a piece of pottery has no practical purpose, the making of it is typically a collaborative and semi-industrial one, involving many participants with different skills.

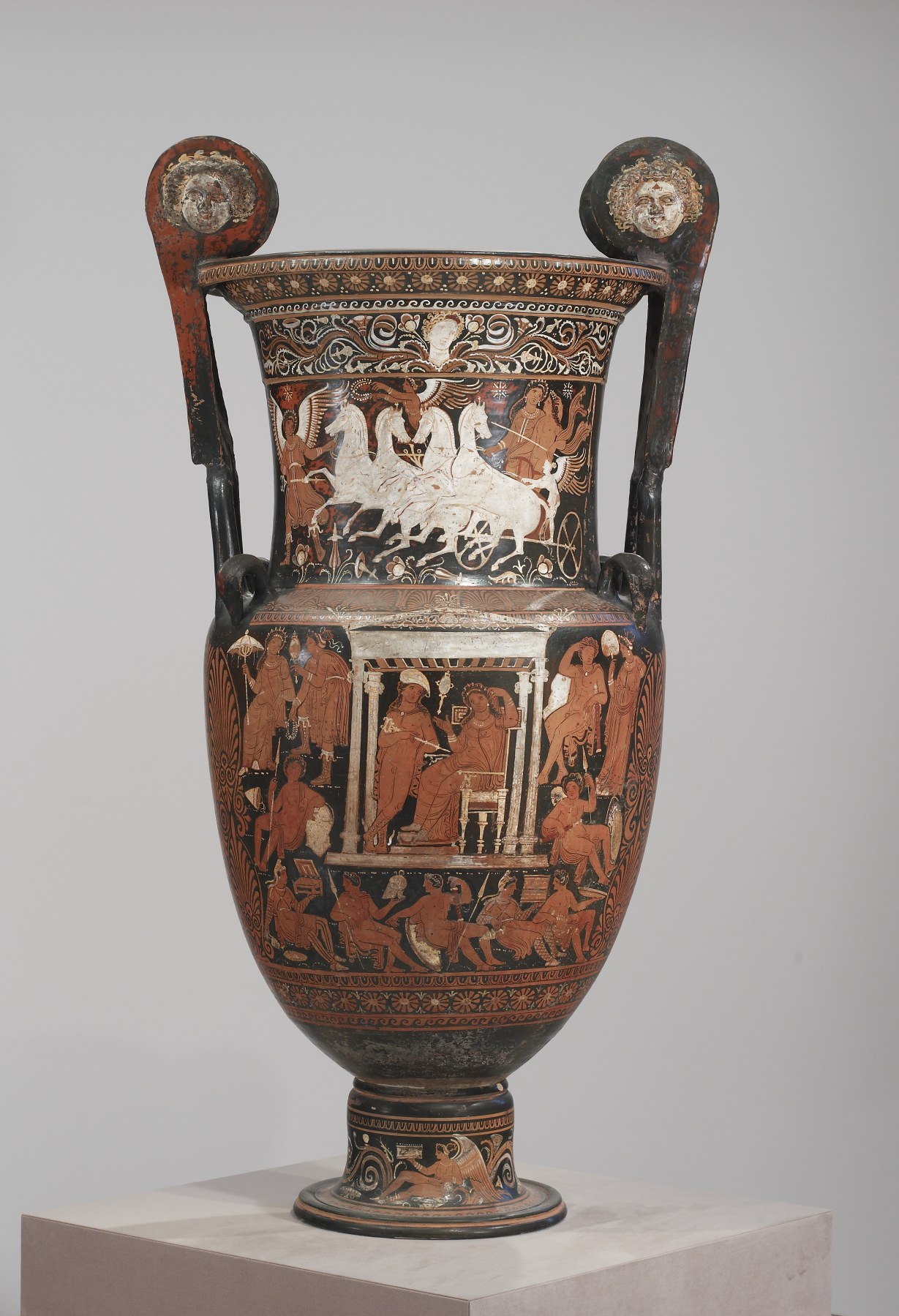
Ancient Greek volute krater; 320–310 BC; ceramic; height: 1.1 m; Walters Art Museum (Baltimore, US)

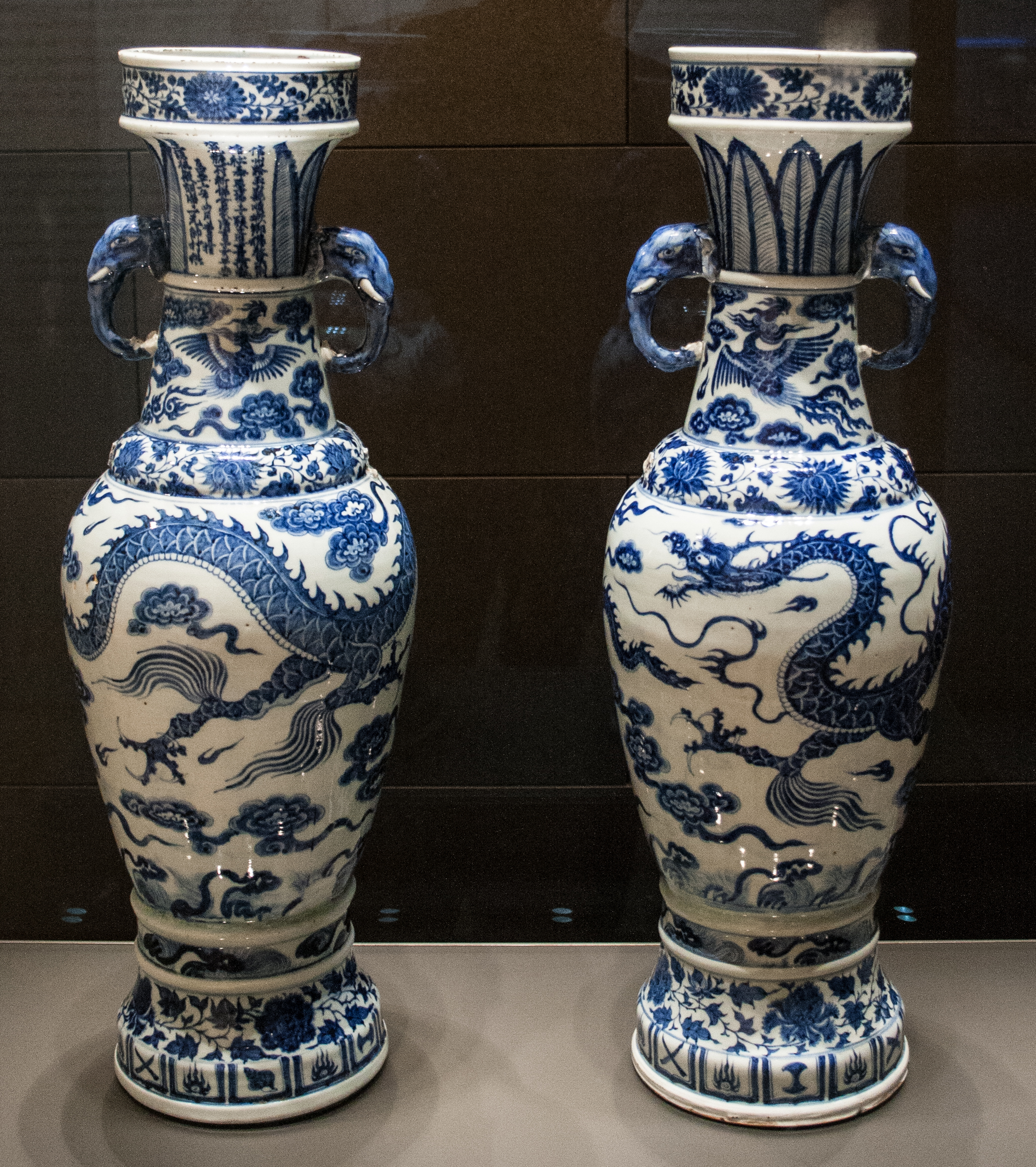
The David Vases; 1351 (the Yuan dynasty); porcelain, cobalt blue decor under glaze; height: 63.8 cm; British Museum (London)

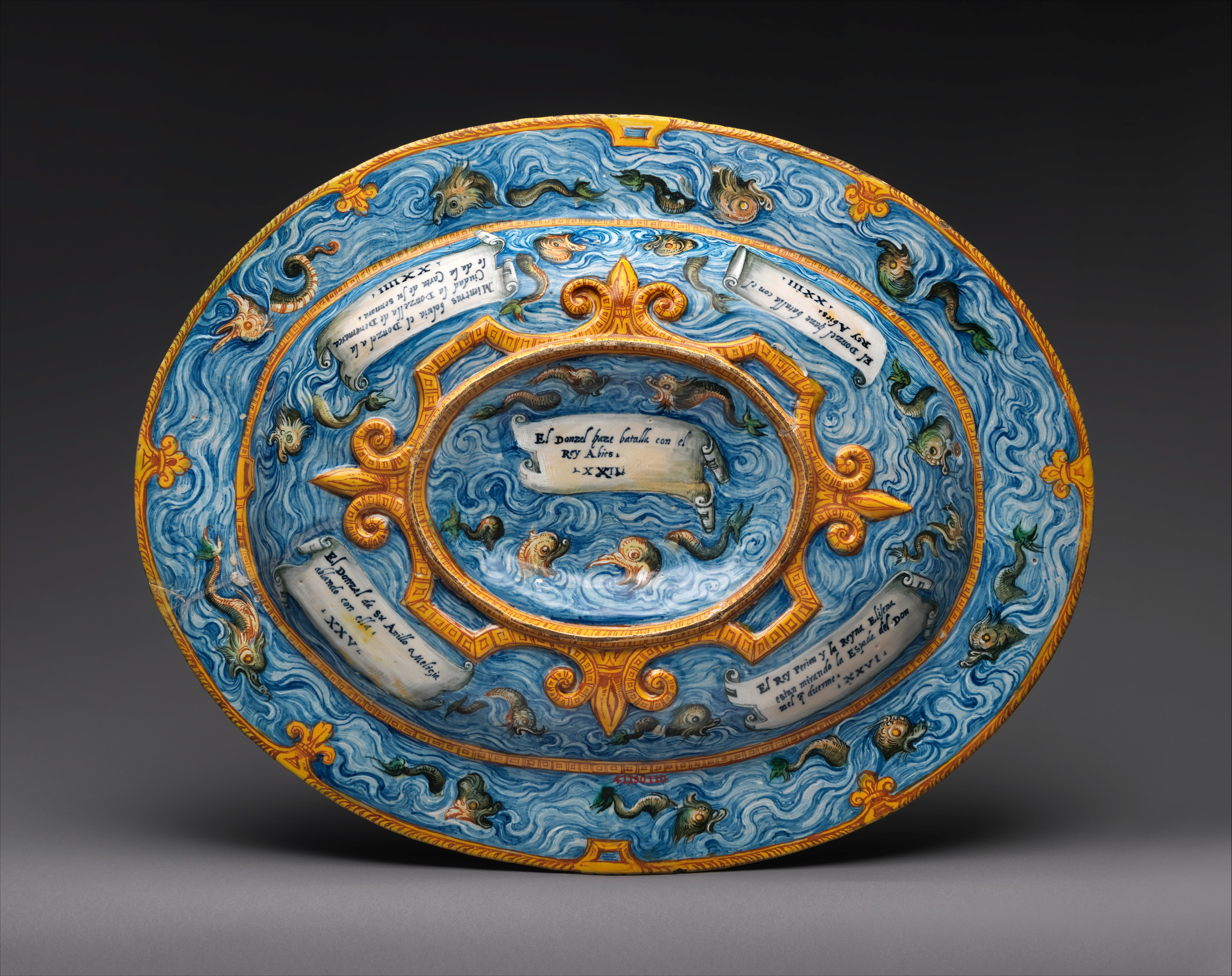
Renaissance oval basin or dish with subject from Amadis of Gaul; c. 1559–1564; maiolica; overall: 6 × 67.3 × 52.4 cm; Metropolitan Museum of Art (New York City)

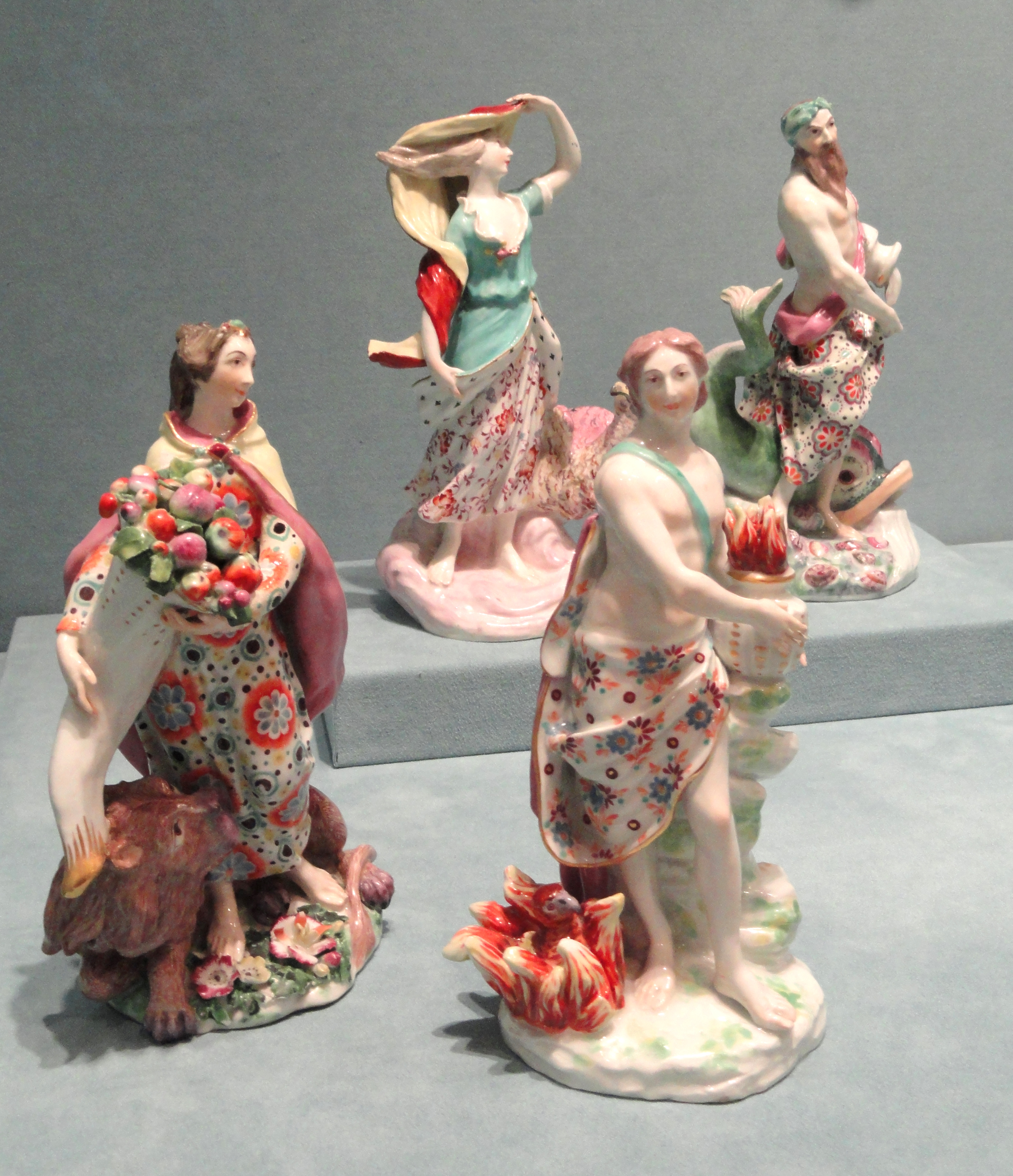
Rococo personifications of Classical elements; 1760s; by the Chelsea porcelain factory; Indianapolis Museum of Art (Indianapolis, U.S.)

==== Sculpture ====
Sculpture is three-dimensional artwork created by shaping hard or plastic material, commonly stone (either rock or marble), metal, or wood. Some sculptures are created directly by carving; others are assembled, built up and fired, welded, molded, or cast. Because sculpture involves the use of materials that can be moulded or modulated, it is considered one of the plastic arts. The majority of public art is sculpture. Many sculptures together in a garden setting may be referred to as a sculpture garden.

Sculpture in stone survives far better than works of art in perishable materials, and often represents the majority of the surviving works (other than pottery) from ancient cultures; conversely, traditions of sculpture in wood may have vanished almost entirely. However, most ancient sculpture was brightly painted, and this has been lost.

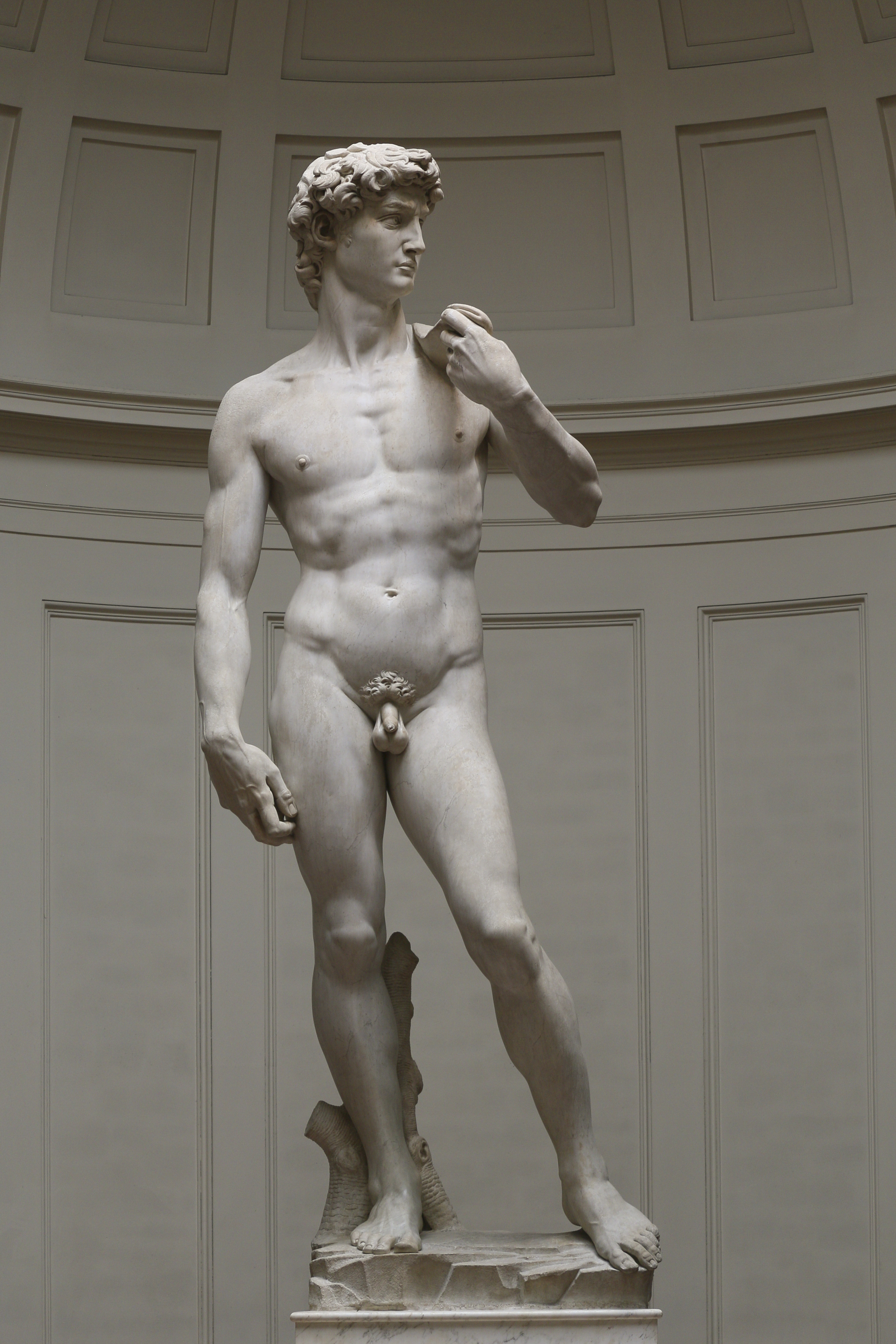
David; by Michelangelo; 1501–1504; marble; 517 cm × 199 cm; Galleria dell'Accademia (Florence)

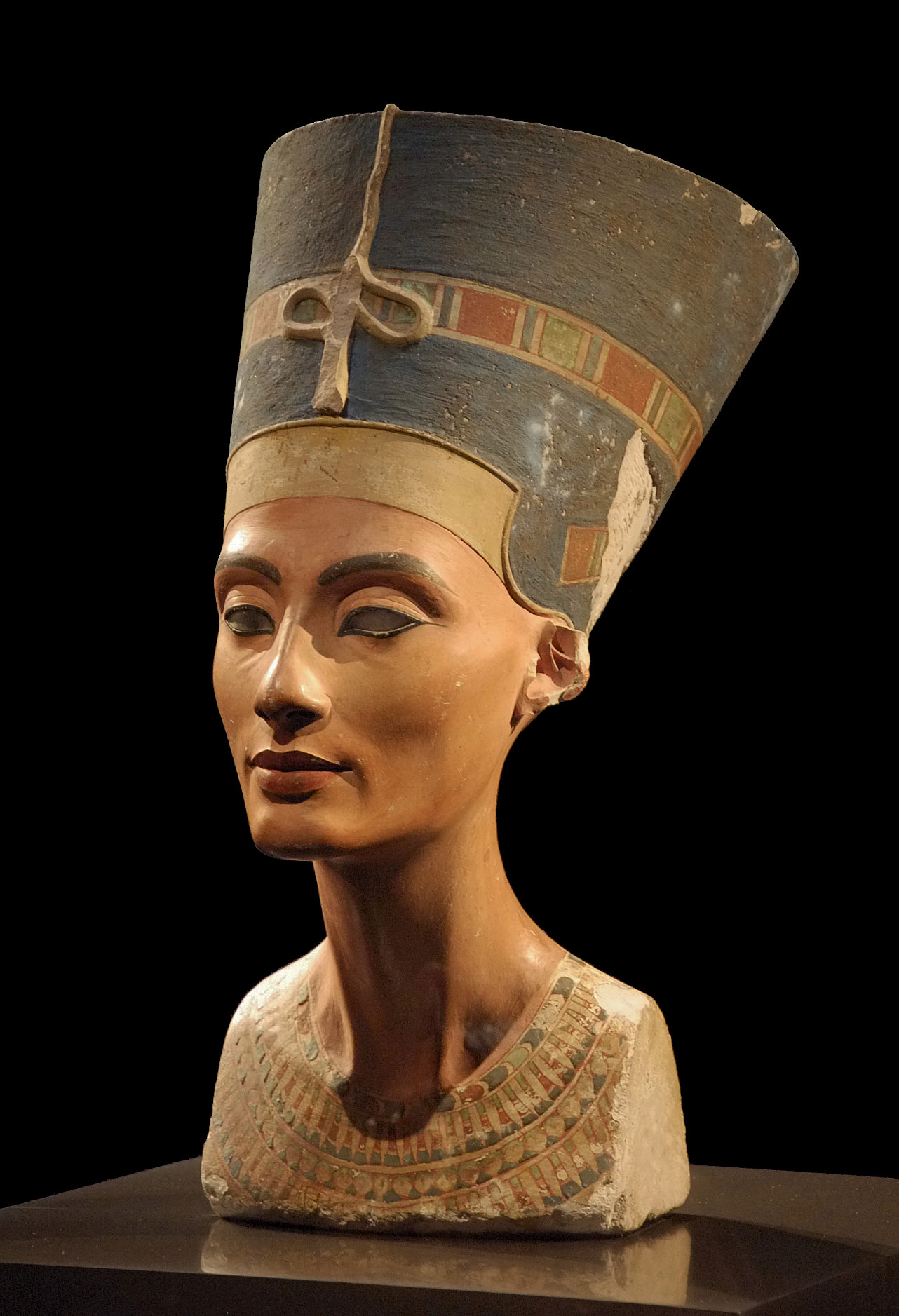
The Nefertiti Bust; 1352–1332 BC; painted limestone; height: 50 cm; Neues Museum (Berlin, Germany)

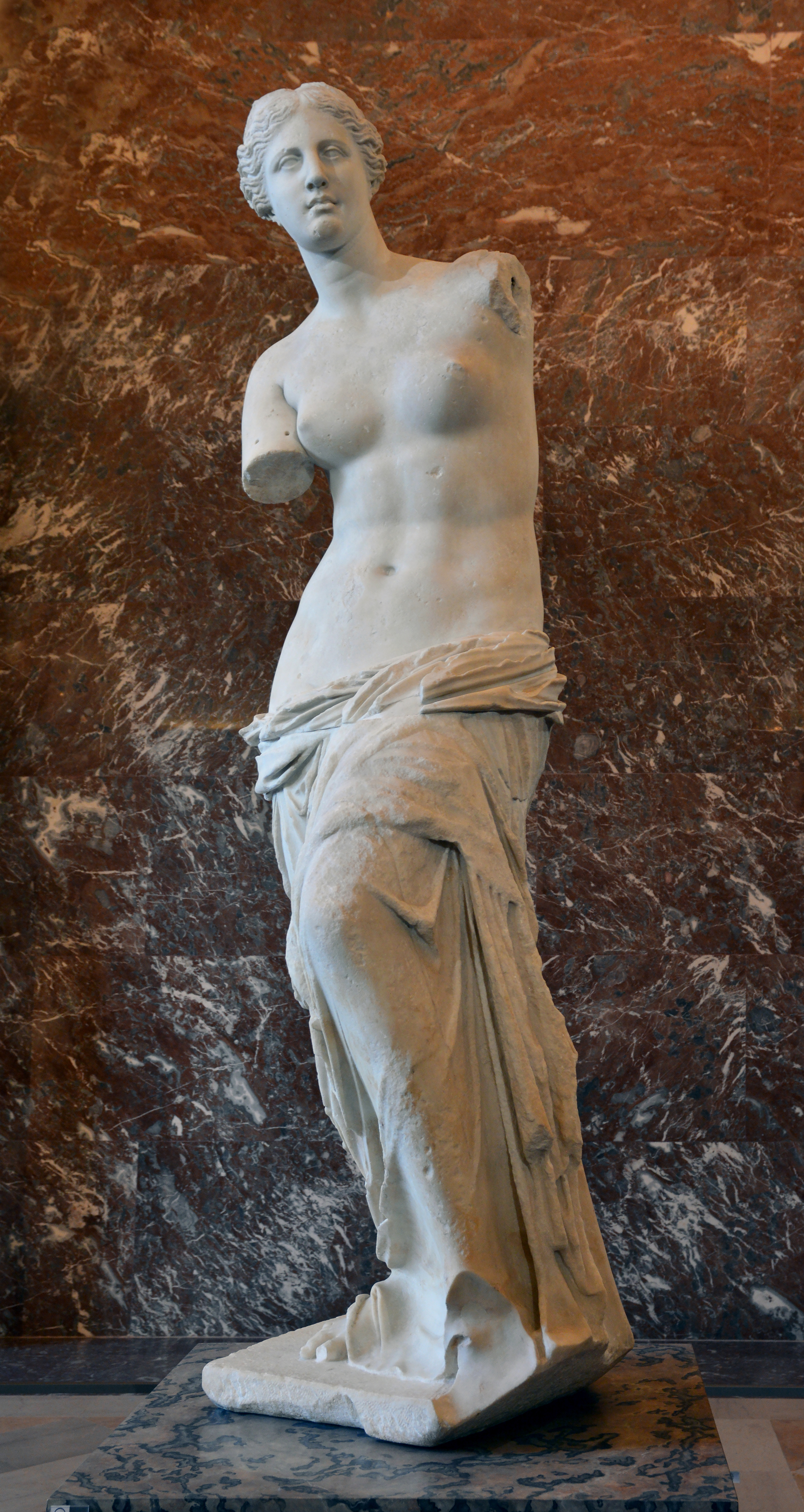
Venus de Milo; 130–100 BC; marble; height: 203 cm (80 in); Louvre

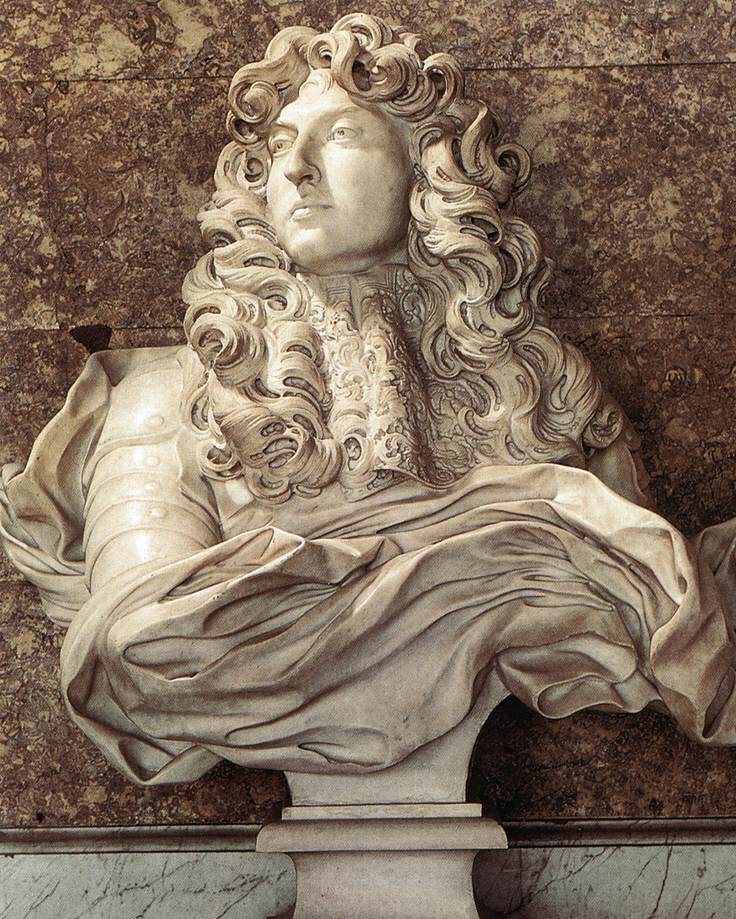
The Bust of Louis XIV by Gian Lorenzo Bernini; 1665; marble; 105 × 99 × 46 cm; Palace of Versailles

=== Conceptual art ===
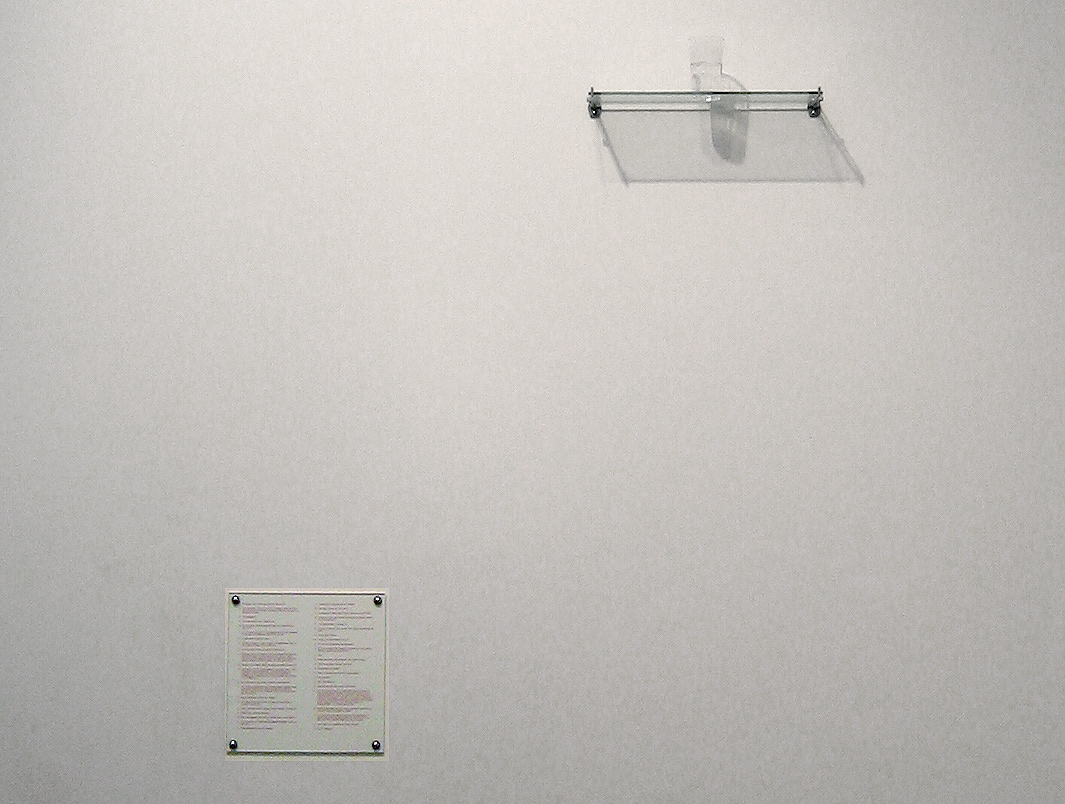
An Oak Tree by Michael Craig-Martin, 1973

Conceptual art is art in which the concept(s) or idea(s) involved in the work take precedence over traditional aesthetic and material concerns.

The inception of the term in the 1960s referred to a strict and focused practice of idea-based art that often defied traditional visual criteria associated with the visual arts in its presentation as text. However, through its association with the Young British Artists and the Turner Prize during the 1990s, its popular usage, particularly in the UK, developed as a synonym for all contemporary art that does not practice the traditional skills of painting and sculpture.

== Performing arts ==
=== Music ===
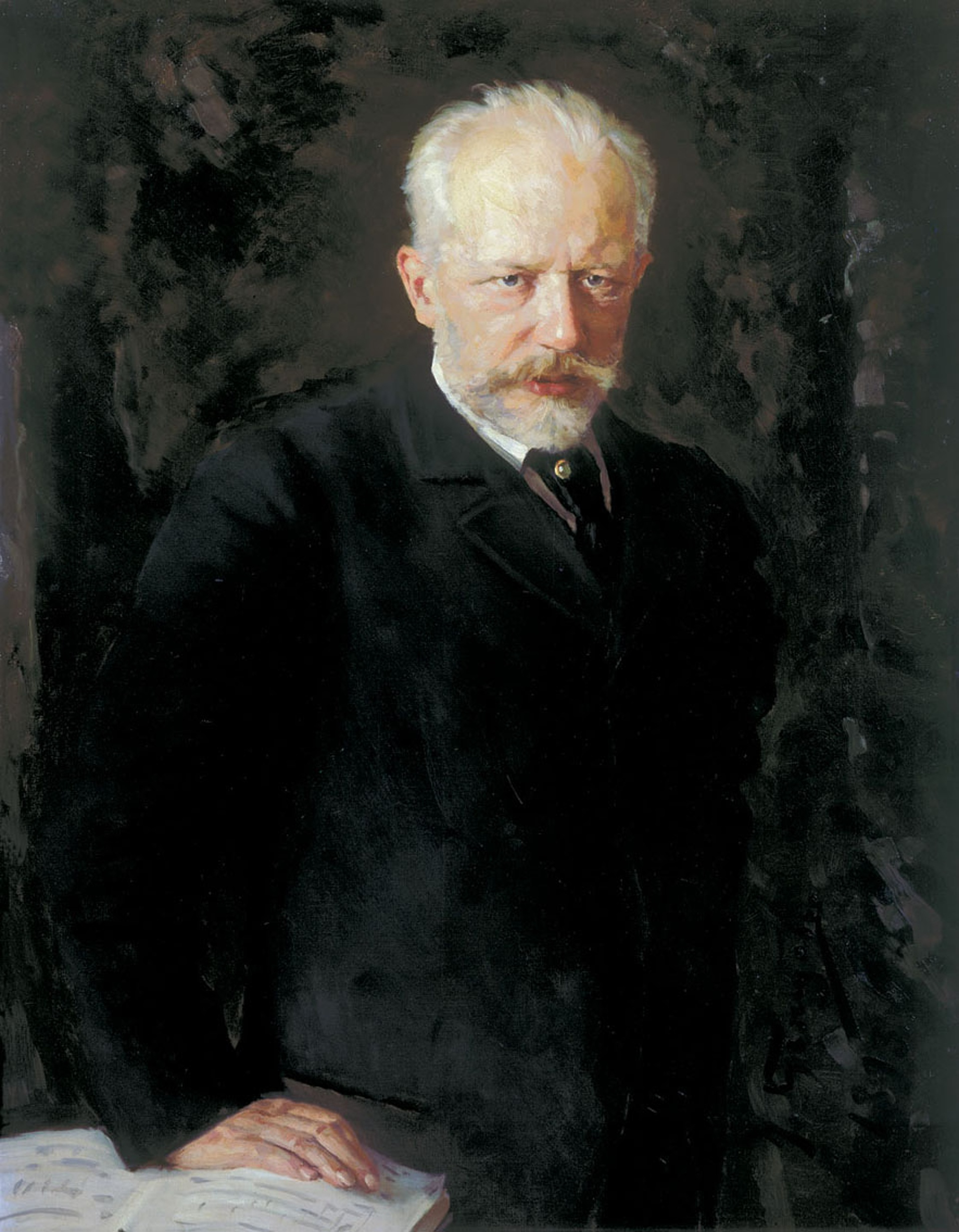
Pyotr Ilyich Tchaikovsky (1840–1893), the famous composer

Music is an art form and cultural activity whose medium is sound organized in time. The common elements of music are pitch (which governs melody and harmony), rhythm (and its associated concepts tempo, meter, and articulation), dynamics (loudness and softness), and the sonic qualities of timbre and texture (which are sometimes termed the "color" of a musical sound). Different styles or types of music may emphasize, de-emphasize or omit some of these elements.

Music is performed with a vast range of instruments and vocal techniques ranging from singing to rapping; there are solely instrumental pieces, solely vocal pieces (such as songs without instrumental accompaniment) and pieces that combine singing and instruments.

The word derives from Greek μουσική (mousike, "art of the Muses").

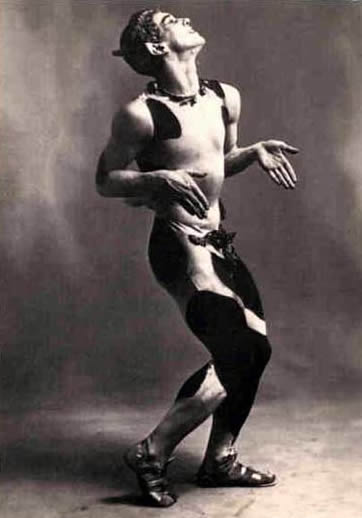
Vaslav Nijinsky dancing the Faun in L'après-midi d'un faune (1912)

=== Dance ===
Dance is an art form that generally refers to movement of the body, usually rhythmic, and to music, used as a form of expression, social interaction or presented in a spiritual or performance setting. Dance is also used to describe methods of nonverbal communication (see body language) between humans or animals (bee dance, patterns of behaviour such as a mating dance), motion in inanimate objects ("the leaves danced in the wind"), and certain musical genres. In sports, gymnastics, figure skating and synchronized swimming are dance disciplines while the kata of the martial arts are often compared to dances.

=== Theatre ===
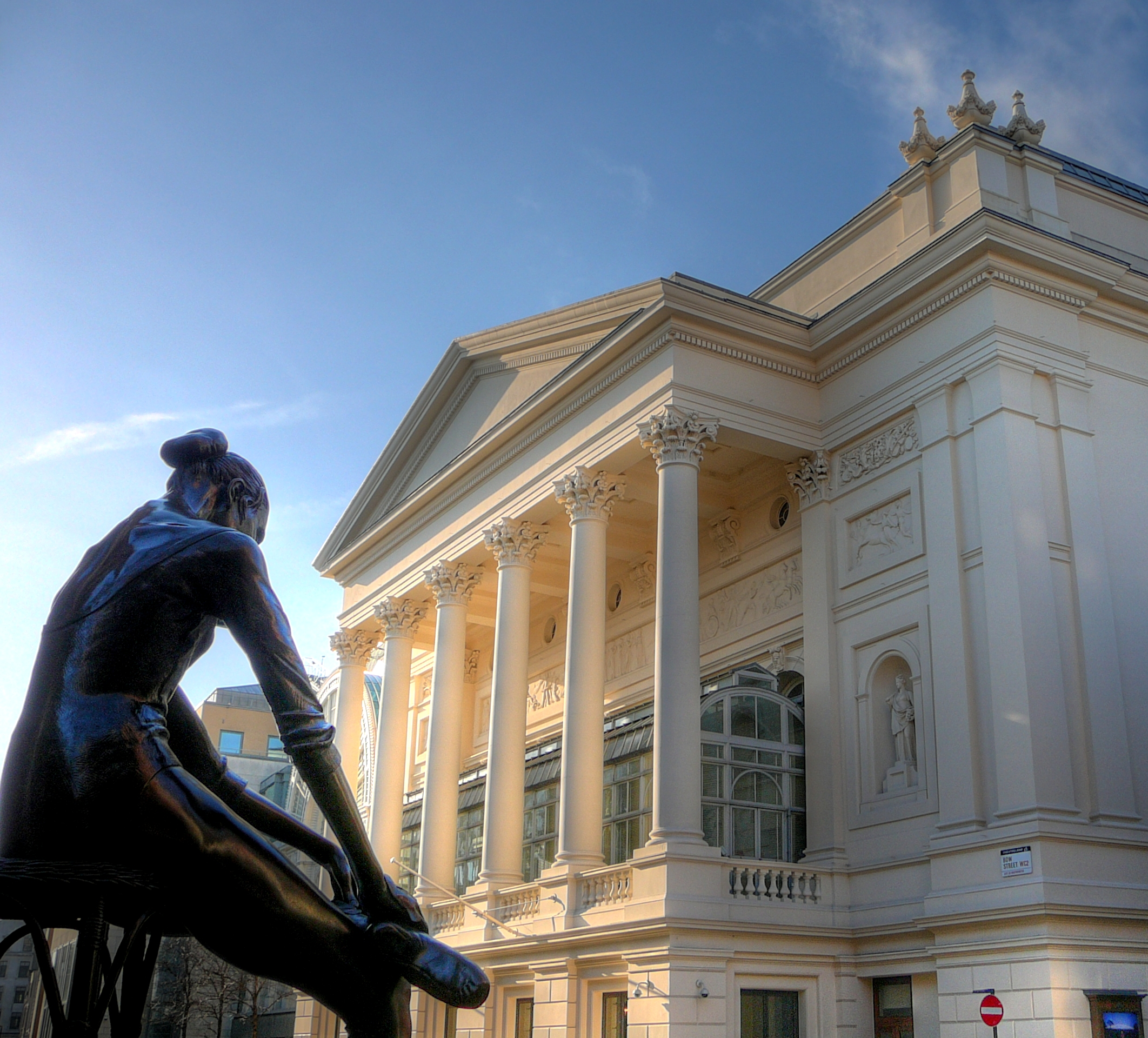
The Royal Opera House, London

Modern Western theatre is dominated by realism, including drama and comedy. Another popular Western form is musical theatre. Classical forms of theatre, including Greek and Roman drama, classic English drama (Shakespeare and Marlowe included), and French theater (Molière included), are still performed today. In addition, performances of classic Eastern forms such as Noh and Kabuki can be found in the West, although with less frequency.

=== Film ===
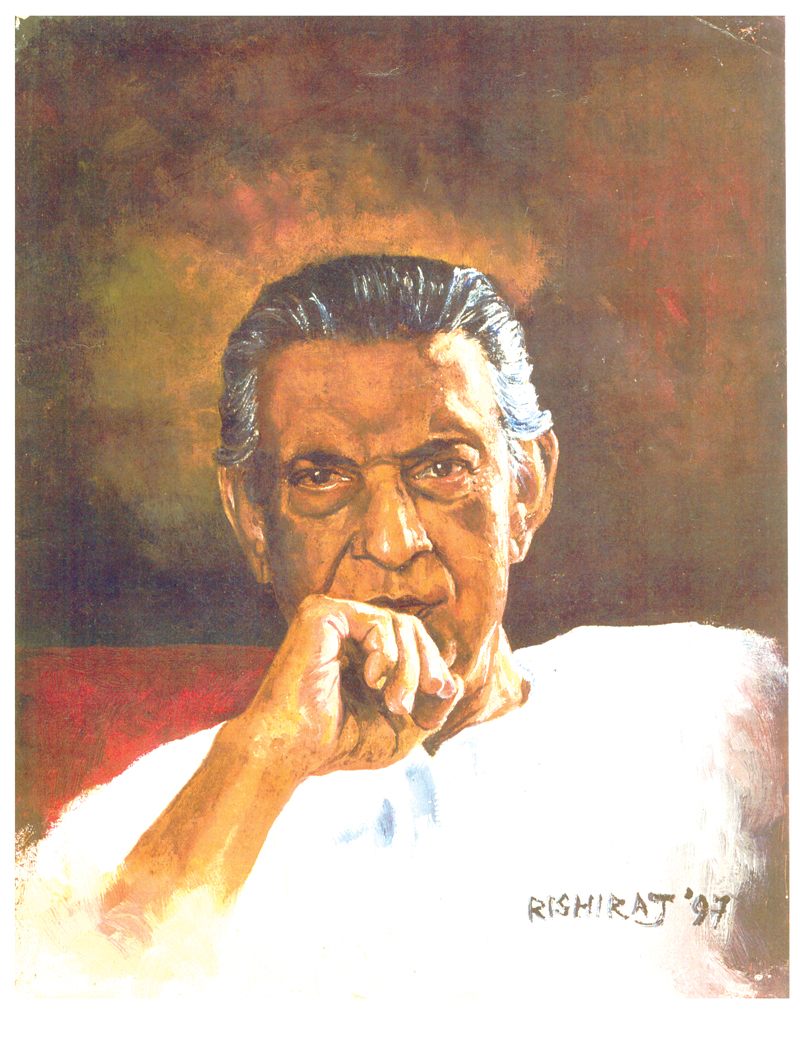
Satyajit Ray, Indian Bengali film director

Fine arts film is a term that encompasses motion pictures and the field of film as a fine art form. A fine arts movie theater is a venue, usually a building, for viewing such movies. Films are produced by recording images from the world with cameras, or by creating images using animation techniques or special effects. Films are cultural artifacts created by specific cultures, which reflect those cultures, and, in turn, affect them. Film is considered to be an important art form, a source of popular entertainment and a powerful method for educating – or indoctrinating – citizens. The visual elements of cinema give motion pictures a universal power of communication. Some films have become popular worldwide attractions by using dubbing or subtitles that translate the dialogue.

Cinematography is the discipline of making lighting and camera choices when recording photographic images for the cinema. It is closely related to the art of still photography, though many additional issues arise when both the camera and elements of the scene may be in motion.

Independent filmmaking often takes place outside of Hollywood, or other major studio systems. An independent film (or indie film) is a film initially produced without financing or distribution from a major movie studio. Creative, business, and technological reasons have all contributed to the growth of the indie film scene in the late 20th and early 21st century.

== Poetry ==
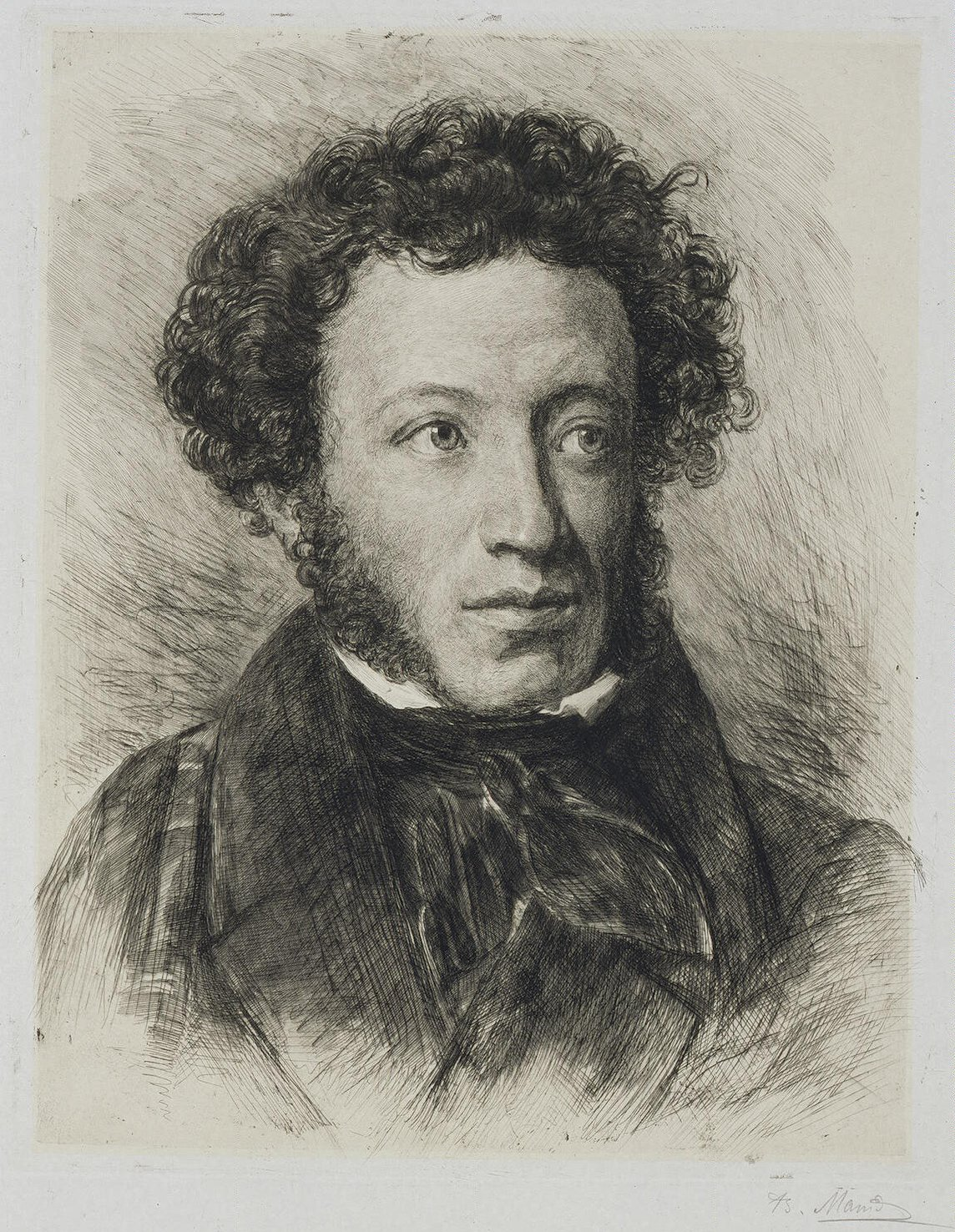
Vasily Mate, Portrait of the poet Alexander Pushkin (1899)

Poetry (the term derives from a variant of the Greek term ποίησις (poiesis, "to make") is a form of literature that uses aesthetic and rhythmic qualities of language—such as sound symbolism, phonaesthetics and metre—to evoke meanings in addition to, or in place of, the prosaic ostensible meaning.

== Other ==
- Electronic media – perhaps the newest medium for fine art, since it utilizes modern technologies such as computers from production to presentation. Includes, amongst others, video, digital photography, digital printmaking and interactive pieces.
- Textiles, including quilt art and "wearable" or "pre-wearable" creations, frequently reach the category of fine art objects, sometimes like part of an art display.
- Western art (or Classical) music is a performing art frequently considered to be fine art.
- Origami – The last century has witnessed a renewed interest in understanding the behavior of folding matter with contributions from artists and scientists. Origami is different from other arts: while painting requires the addition of matter, and sculpture involves subtraction, origami does not add or subtract: it transforms. Origami artists are pushing the limits of an art increasingly committed to its time, with a bloodline ending in technology and spacecraft. Its computational aspect and shareable quality (empowered by social networks) are parts of the puzzle that is making origami a paradigmatic art of the 21st century.

== Academic study ==
=== Asia ===
- The Guangzhou Academy of Fine Arts is a Chinese national university based in Guangzhou which provides Fine Arts and Design Doctoral, Master and bachelor's degrees.
- Academy of Fine Arts, Kolkata is a Fine Art college in the Indian city of Kolkata, West Bengal.
- O.P. Jindal Global University, Sonipat, Haryana – Offers programs related to Fine Arts.

=== South America ===
- Brazil: The Institute for the Arts in Brazilia has departments for theater, visual arts, industrial design, and music.

=== United States ===
In the United States an academic course of study in fine art may include the Bachelor of Arts in Fine Art, or a Bachelor of Fine Arts, and/or a Master of Fine Arts degree – traditionally the terminal degree in the field. Doctor of Fine Arts degrees —earned, as opposed to honorary degrees— have begun to emerge at some US academic institutions, however. Major schools of art in the US:

- Yale University, New Haven, CT – MFA, BA.
- Rhode Island School of Design, Providence, RI – MFA, BFA.
- School of the Art Institute of Chicago, Chicago, Illinois – MFA in Studio, MFA in Writing.
- University of California Los Angeles, Los Angeles, CA – MFA
- California Institute of the Arts, Valencia, CA
- Carnegie Mellon University, Pittsburgh, PA
- Cranbrook Academy of Art, Bloomfield Hills, MI
- Maryland Institute College of Art, Baltimore, MD
- Fordham University, (B.F.A)
- Columbia University, MFA, joint JD/MFA degree, PHD.
- Juilliard School, New York, NY is a performing arts conservatory established in 1905. It educates and trains undergraduate and graduate students in dance, drama, and music. It is widely regarded as one of the world's leading music schools, with some of the most prestigious arts programs.
- ArtCenter College of Design, Pasadena, CA is a nonprofit, private college founded in 1930. ArtCenter offers undergraduate and graduate programs in a wide variety of art and design fields, as well as public programs for children and high school students. U.S. News & World Report also ranks Art Center's Art, Industrial Design and Media Design Practices programs among the top 20 graduate schools in the U.S.

== See also ==
- The arts
- High culture#High art
- Performance art
- Visual arts
