= Francioni =

Francioni is an Italian surname. Notable people with the surname include:

- Joan Francioni, American computer scientist
- Wilmo Francioni (born 1948), Italian road cyclist

== See also ==
- Francini
- Stadio Domenico Francioni
