= Hydraulis of Dion =

Coordinates: 40.170182°N 22.486231°E

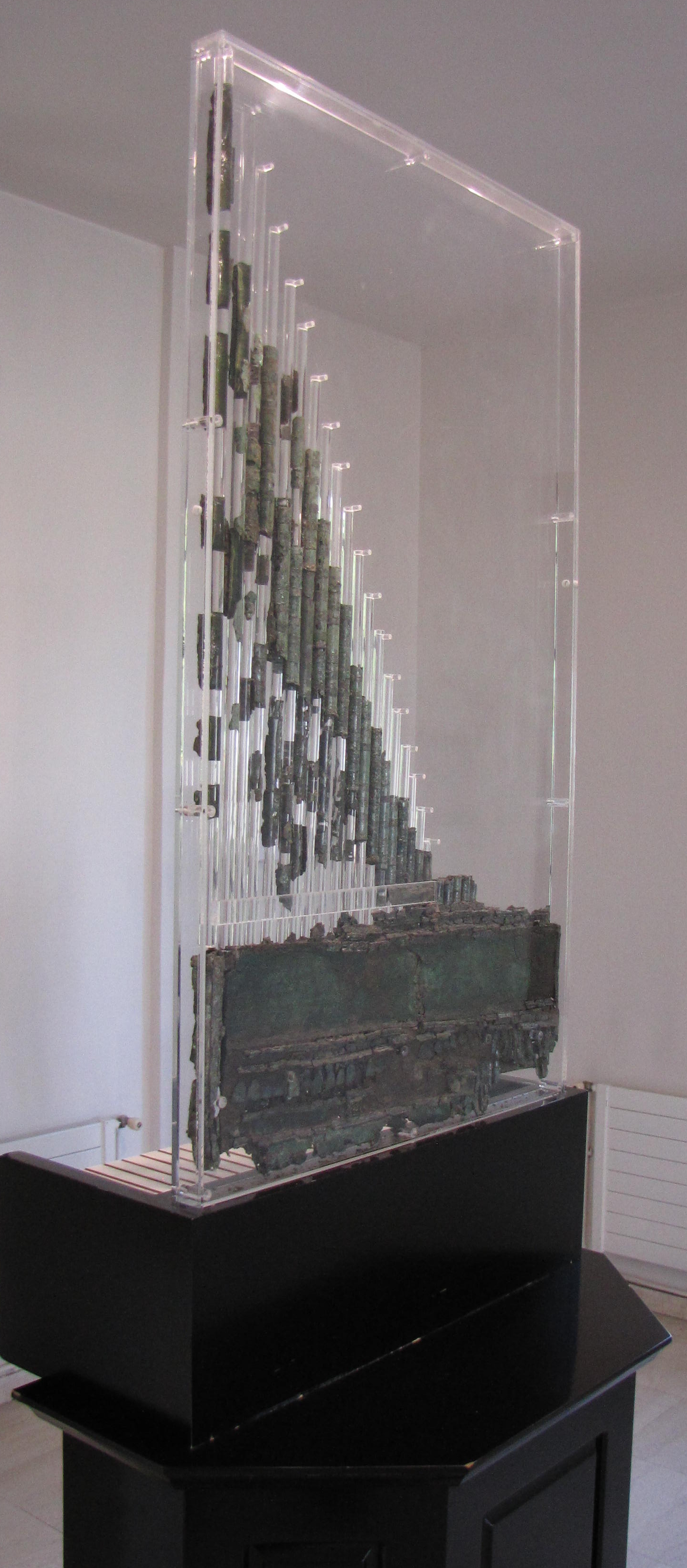
Hydraulis of Dion

The Hydraulis of Dion (Ancient Greek: Ὕδραυλις τοῦ Δίου, romanized: Húdraulis toû Díou) is a unique exhibit of the Archaeological Museum of Dion. It is the earliest archeological example of a pipe organ to date.

== Excavation history ==
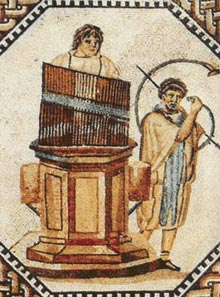
Ancient water organ

At the beginning of the 1980s, the area was drained east of the main road of ancient Dion. The neighboring river had permanently flooded parts of the archaeological site. In this area, east of the main road, excavations were carried out in the summer of 1992 under the direction of Dimitrios Pandermalis. Opposite the villa of Dionysus, the foundations of a building were uncovered. On the morning of 19 August 1992, archaeologists found pieces of small copper tubes. Furthermore, one found a larger, rectangular, copper plate. The individual finds were partially connected by the compacted soil. After recognizing the meaning of the find, the earth was widely removed and sent for further processing to the workshops. After cleaning the items, it was recognized that it was a musical instrument, a hydraulis. The find was dated to the 1st century BC.

== The instrument ==
The hydraulis is considered the oldest keyboard instrument in the world. It was built in the 3rd century BC, invented by the engineer Ctesibius in Alexandria.

The height of the instrument is 120 cm, width 70 cm. The organ pipes are arranged in two rows and consist of 24 pipes with a diameter of 18 mm and 16 narrow pipes with about 10 mm diameter. They were decorated with silver rings. The body of the organ was decorated with silver stripes and multicolored, rectangular glass ornaments. Valves were opened by keyboard and the air flowing through the organ pipe generated the sound. The instrument is structurally classified between the water organ described by Hero of Alexandria and Vitruvius.

== Spreading as a musical instrument ==
After its invention in the Egyptian Alexandria, the organ arrived in Greece in the Hellenistic period. After its conquest by the Romans it was spread in the Roman Empire. There it was used for musical accompaniment in the competitions in the arenas and played by the wealthy as a domestic musical instrument. At the Byzantine court the hydraulis was a prestigious object. In 757, Constantine V sent an organ as a gift to the French king Pippin the Short. So it came to Central Europe and was discovered by the Catholic Church and eventually developed into a church organ.

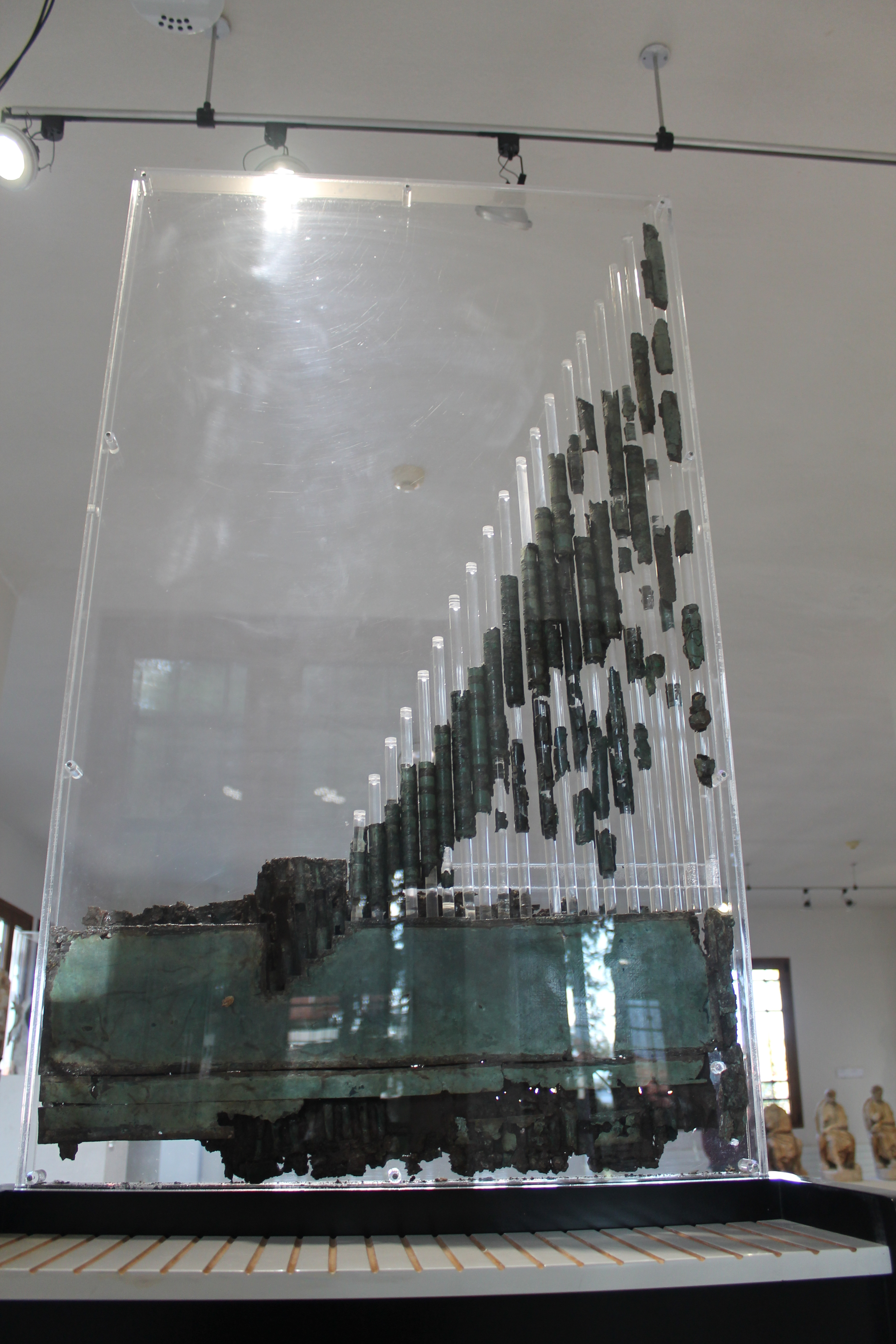
Hydraulis of Dion, taken at the Museum of Dion in December 2021

== Replica of the hydraulis of Dion ==
With the support of the Greek Ministry of Culture and Sport and the help of Professor Pandermalis, a reconstruction of a water organ was started at the European Cultural Center of Delphi in 1995. They kept to ancient records and to the original excavated in Dion. The instrument was completed in 1999.

== Literature ==
- Dimitrios Pandermalis: Η Ύδραυλις του Δίου. In: Ministry for culture, Ministry for Macedonia and Thrace, Aristotle-University Thessaloniki: Το Αρχαιολογικό Έργο στη Μακεδονία και Θράκη. Volume 6, 1992, Thessaloniki 1995, ISSN 1106-5311 pages. 217–222. (Greek language)
- Dimitrios Pandermalis: Dion. The archaeological site and the museum. Athens 1997.
- Hellenic Republic, Ministry of culture and sports, Onassis Foundation USA: Gods and Mortals at Olympus. S. 26, Edited by Dimitrios Pandermalis, ISBN 978-0-9906142-2-7.
- Free Travel Guide about the Olympus region Title: Mount Olympus - Ancient Sites, Museums, Monasteries and Churches
