= Water organ =

Pipe organ using water as power source

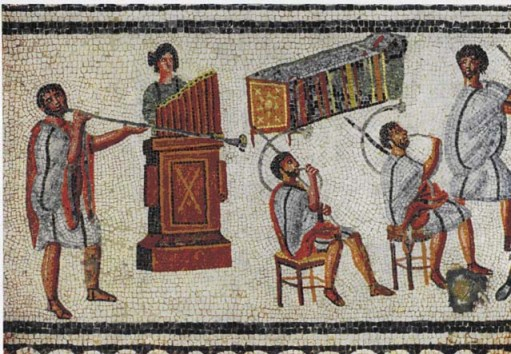
Musicians with cornua and a water organ, detail from the Zliten mosaic, 2nd century CE

The water organ or hydraulic organ (Greek: ὕδραυλις = ὕδωρ + αυλός / αυλη; early types are sometimes called hydraulos, hydraulus or hydraula) is a type of pipe organ blown by air, where the power source pushing the air is derived by water from a natural source (e.g. by a waterfall) or by a manual pump. Consequently, the water organ lacks a bellows, blower, or compressor.

The hydraulic organ is often confused with the hydraulis. The hydraulis is the name of a Greek instrument created by Ctesibius of Alexandria. The hydraulis has a reservoir of air which is inserted into a cistern of water. The air is pushed into the reservoir with hand pumps, and exits the reservoir as pressurized air to blow through the pipes. The reservoir is open on the bottom, allowing water to maintain the pressure on the air as the air supply fluctuates from either the pumps pushing more air in, or the pipes letting air out.

On the water organ, since the 15th century, the water is also used as a source of power to drive a mechanism similar to that of the barrel organ, which has a pinned barrel that contains a specific song to be played. The hydraulis in ancient Greek is often imagined as an automatic organ, but there is no source evidence for it.

== Hydraulis ==
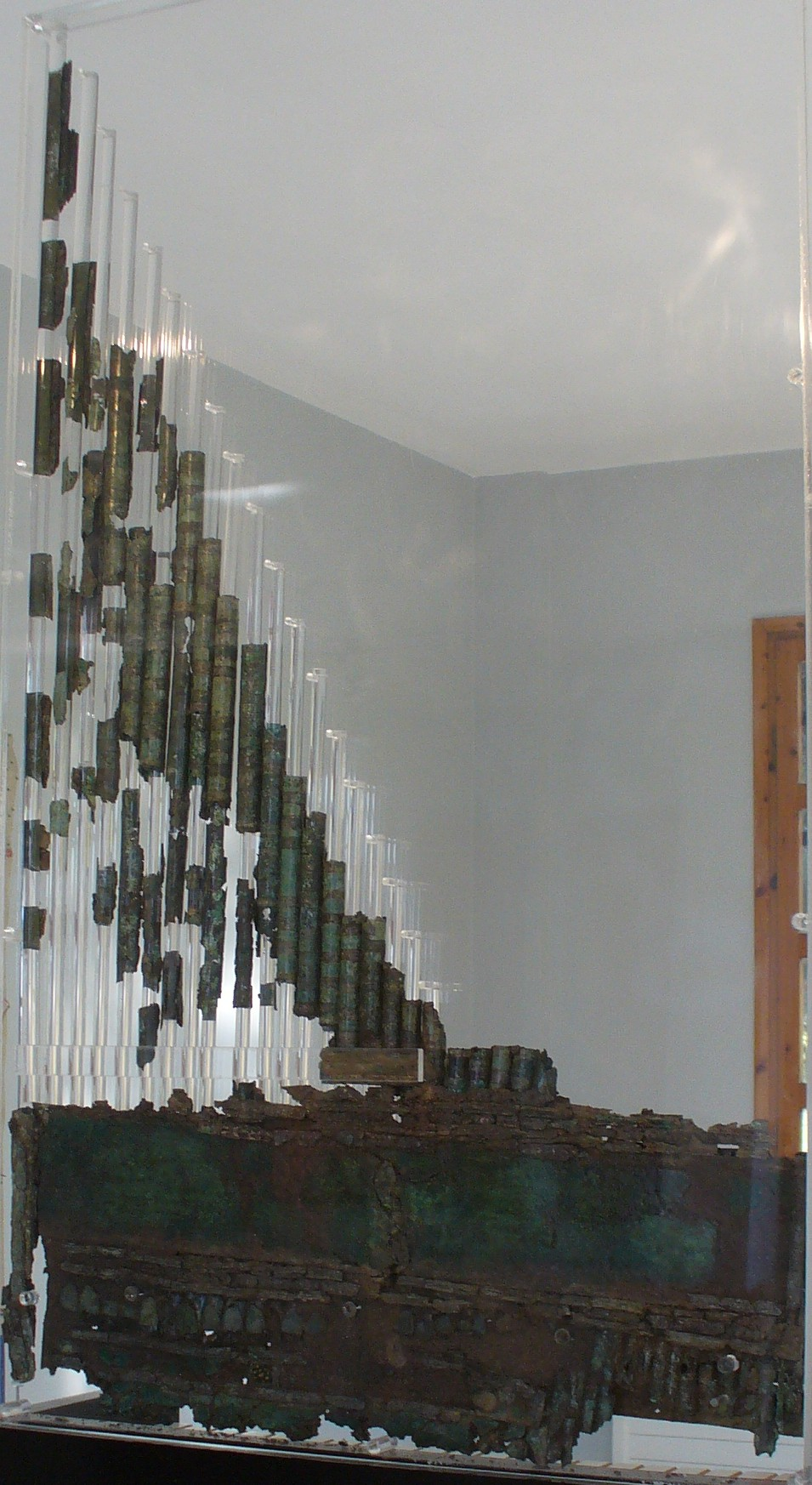
Fragments of a hydraulis, 1st century BCE, Archaeological Museum of Dion, Greece

A hydraulis is an early type of pipe organ that operated by converting the dynamic energy of water (Ancient Greek: ὕδωρ, romanized: húdōr) into air pressure to drive the pipes (Ancient Greek: αὐλός, romanized: aulós). Hence its name hydraulis, literally "water (driven) pipe (instrument)". It is attributed to the Hellenistic scientist Ctesibius of Alexandria, an engineer of the 3rd century BC. The hydraulis was the world's earliest keyboard instrument, and was the predecessor of the modern pipe organ. The ancient hydraulis was operated by pressing keys on the manual; the hydraulis' keys were well-balanced, and could be played with a light touch, as is clear from the Latin poem by Claudian (late 4th century), who uses that exact phrase to describe playing the keyboard:

magna levi detrudens murmura tactu ... intonet	"let him thunder forth as he presses out mighty roarings with a light touch"

== Mechanics ==
Typically, water is supplied from some height above the instrument through a pipe, and air is introduced into the water stream by aspiration (using the Bernoulli effect) into the main pipe from a side-pipe holding its top above the water source. Both water and air arrive together in the camera aeolis (wind chamber). Here, water and air separate and the compressed air is driven into a wind-trunk on top of the camera aeolis, to blow the organ pipes. Two perforated 'splash plates' or 'diaphragms' prevent water spray from getting into the organ pipes.

The water, having been separated from the air, leaves the camera aeolis at the same rate as it enters. It then drives a water wheel, which in turn drives the musical cylinder and the movements attached. To start the organ, the tap above the entry pipe is turned on and, given a continuous flow of water, the organ plays until the tap is closed again.

Many water organs had simple water-pressure regulating devices. At the Palazzo del Quirinale, the water flows from a hilltop spring (once abundant, now only sufficient to play the organ for about 30 minutes at a time), coursing through the palace itself into a stabilizing 'room' some 18 metres (59 feet) above the camera aeolis in the organ grotto. This drop provides sufficient power to maintain air pressure to the restored six-stop instrument.

Among Renaissance writers on the water organ, Salomon de Caus is particularly informative. His book of 1615 includes a short treatise on making water organs, advice on tuning and registration, and many fine engravings showing the instruments, their mechanisms and scenes in which they were used. It also includes an example of suitable music for water organ, the madrigal Chi farà fed' al cielo by Alessandro Striggio, arranged by Peter Philips.

== History ==
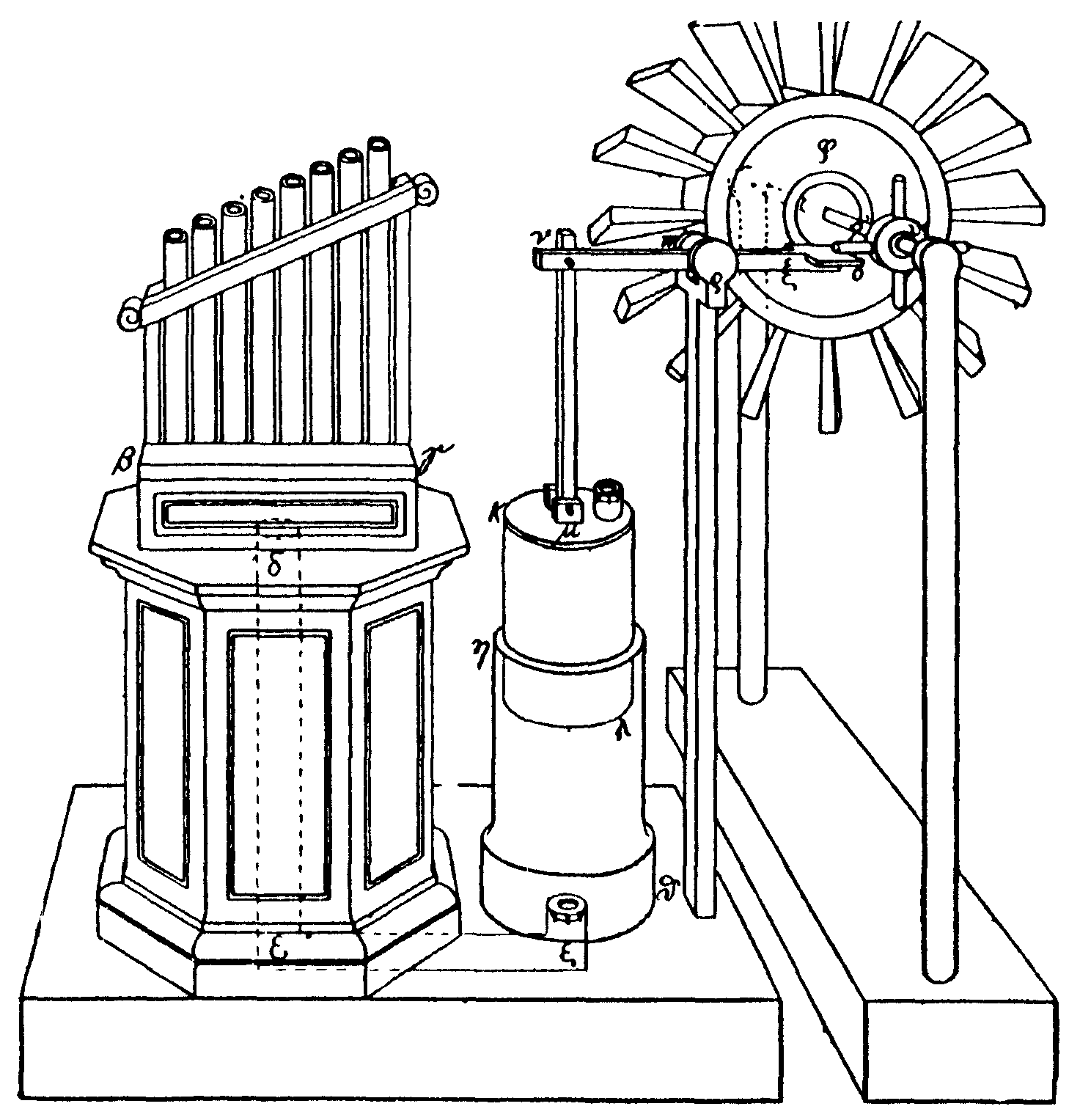
A modern reconstruction of the wind organ and wind wheel of Heron of Alexandria

Water organs were described in the numerous writings of the famous Ctesibius (3rd century BC), Philo of Byzantium (3rd century BC) and Hero of Alexandria (c. 62 AD). Like the water clocks (clepsydra) of Plato's time, they were not regarded as playthings, but might have had a particular significance in Greek philosophy, which made use of models and simulacra of this type. Hydraulically blown organ pipes were used to imitate birdsong, and musicologists Susi Jeans and Arthur W.J.G. Ord-Hume have suggested that it was used to create the sounds of the Vocal Memnon. For the latter, solar heat was used to syphon water from one closed tank into another, thereby producing compressed air for sounding the pipes. The Talmud mentions the instrument as having been played in the Jerusalem Temple.

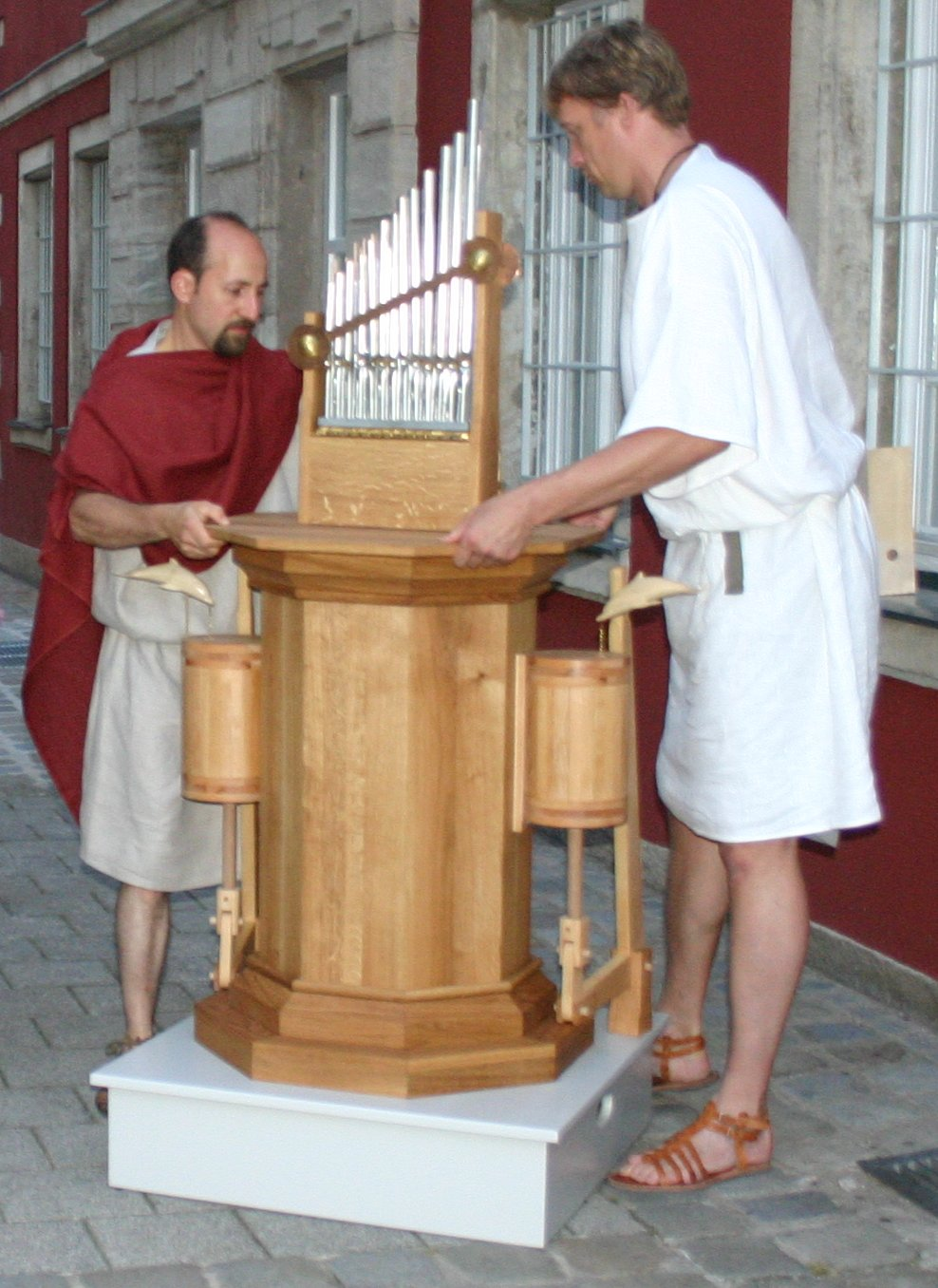
Reconstruction of hydraulic organ

After its invention by the Greeks, the hydraulis continued to be used through antiquity in the Roman world. Characteristics of the hydraulis have been inferred from mosaics, paintings, literary references, and partial remains. In 1931, the remains of a hydraulis were discovered in Hungary, with an inscription dating it to 228 AD. The leather and wood of the instrument had decomposed, but the surviving metal parts made it possible to reconstruct a working replica now in the Aquincum Museum in Budapest. The exact mechanism of wind production is debated, and almost nothing is known about the music played on the hydraulis, but the tone of the pipes can be studied.

In the Middle Ages, Eastern Roman (Byzantine) Empire, Medieval Europe and Muslim world further developed these instruments. A well-known instance of an early positive or portable organ of the 4th century occurs on the obelisk erected to the memory of Theodosius I on his death in 395 AD. Among the illuminated manuscripts of the British Museum there are many miniatures representing interesting varieties of the portable organ of the Middle Ages used in European churches. The Pippin's organ of 757 was a hydraulic organ sent as a gift to the Carolingian empire by the Byzantine emperor Constantine V. A long-distance hydraulic organ that could be heard from sixty miles away was described in Arabic texts and attributed to an ancient Greek figure called Muristus; this individual's identity is unknown, but is sometimes suggested to be an Arabized version of the name Ctesibius.

By the end of the 12th century hydraulic automata were often seen in Italy and the rest of Western Europe. During the Renaissance, water organs again acquired magical and metaphysical connotations among followers of the hermetic and esoteric sciences. Organs were placed in gardens, grottoes and conservatories of royal palaces and the mansions of rich patricians to delight onlookers not only with music but also with displays of automata – dancing figurines, wing-flapping birds and hammering cyclopes – all operated by projections on the musical cylinder. Other types of water organ were played out of sight and were used to simulate musical instruments apparently being played by statues in mythological scenes such as 'Orpheus playing the viol', 'The contest between Apollo and Marsyas' and 'Apollo and the nine Muses'.

The most famous water organ of the 16th century was at the Villa d'Este in Tivoli. Built about 1569–1572 by Lucha Clericho (Luc de Clerc; completed by Claude Venard), it stood about six metres high under an arch, and was fed by a magnificent waterfall; it was described by Mario Cartaro in 1575 as playing 'madrigals and many other things'. G. M. Zappi (Annalie memorie de Tivoli, 1576) wrote: 'When somebody gives the order to play, at first one hears trumpets which play a while and then there is a consonance... Countless gentlemen could not believe that this organ played by itself, according to the registers, with water, but they rather thought that there was somebody inside'. Besides automatically playing at least three pieces of music, it is now known that the organ was also provided with a keyboard.

Other Italian gardens with water organs were at Pratolino, near Florence (c. 1575), Isola de Belvedere, Ferrara (before 1599), Palazzo del Quirinale, Rome (built by Luca Biagi in 1598, restored 1990), Villa Aldobrandini, Frascati (1620), one of the Royal Palaces at Naples (1746), Villa Doria Pamphili, Rome (1758–1759). Of these only the one at the Palazzo del Quirinale has survived. Kircher's illustration in Musurgia universalis (1650), long thought to be a fanciful representation of a hypothetical possibility, has been found to be accurate in every detail when compared to the organ grotto at the Quirinale, except that it was reversed left to right. There are still traces of the instrument at the Villa d'Este but the mineral-rich water of the river which cascades through the organ grotto has caused accretions which have hidden most of the evidence from view.

In the early 17th century, water organs were built in England; Cornelius Drebbel built one for King James I (Harstoffer, 1651), and Salomon de Caus built several at Richmond while in the service of Prince Henry. There was one in Bagnigge Vale, London, the summer home of Nell Gwynn (1650–1687), and Henry Winstanley (1644–1703), the designer of the Eddystone Lighthouse, who is thought to have built one at his home in Saffron Walden, Essex. After the marriage of Princess Elizabeth to the Elector Palatine Prince Friedrich V, de Caus laid out for them the gardens at Heidelberg Castle which became famous for their beautiful and intricate waterworks. A water organ survives in the gardens at Heilbronn, Württemberg, and parts of one at the Wilhelmshöhe gardens in Kassel. The brothers Francini constructed waterworks and organs at Saint Germain-en-Laye and Versailles, which reached new heights of splendour and extravagance.

By the end of the 17th century, however, interest in water organs had waned. As their upkeep was costly they were left to decay and were soon forgotten; by 1920 not one survived (the so-called water organ at Hellbrunn Castle, Salzburg, is a pneumatic organ driven by hydraulically operated bellows).

Their mechanism was subsequently misunderstood until the Dutch engineer Van Dijk pointed out in 1954 that air was supplied to the water organ by aspiration, which was the same method used in forges and smelting works in the 16th and 17th centuries. Aspiration is the process by which air is drawn into an opening into which water flows. For the water organ, a small pipe is arranged so that one end is open to the air and the other extends into a larger pipe that contains flowing water supplied by a stream, pond or stabilizing reservoir. The longer the vertical drop of the water, the more forceful the suction will be and the greater the volume of air sucked in.

== The hydraulis of Dion ==
In 1992, the remains of a 1st-century BC pipe organ were found at Dion, an ancient Macedonian city near Mount Olympus, Greece, during excavations under Dimitrios Pandermalis. This instrument consisted of 24 open pipes of different height with a conical lower ending. The first 19 pipes have a height from 89 to 22 cm (35.0 to 8.7 in). Their inner diameter gradually decreases from 2 to 1.5 cm. These 19 pipes correspond to the "perfect system" of the ancient Greek music which consisted of one chromatic and one diatonic scale. The pipes No. 20 to 24 are smaller and almost equal in height and they seem to form an extension of the diatonic scale. The conical end of the pipes is inserted in a metal plate. At a point just before the narrowing part of every pipe there is an opening producing the turbulence of the pressurized air and the sound. The pipes are stabilized by two metal plates. The one facing outwards has decorative motifs. The instrument had one row of keys. The lower part of the organ, with the air-pressing system, was missing.

In 1995, a reconstruction project started, and by 1999 a working replica of hydraulis was made based on the archaeological finding and on ancient descriptions. The remains of the ancient hydraulis are exhibited at the Archaeological Museum of Dion.

== See also ==
- Calliope
- Hydraulophone
- Muristus
- Organ (music)
- Trompe
