= Archaeological Museum of Dion =

Coordinates: 40.1705°N 22.4872°E

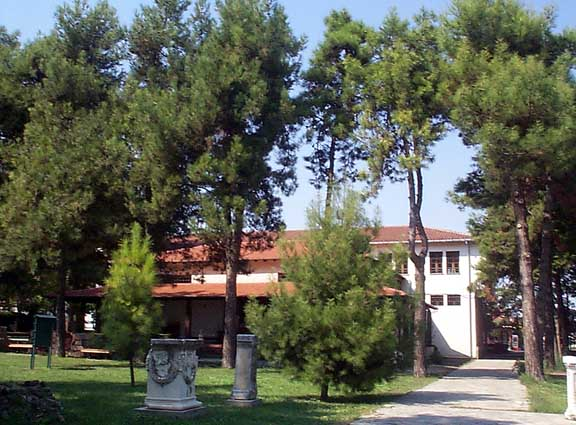
- Dion Archaeological Museum
- Established: 1983
- Location: Epar.Od. Katerinis - Limena Litochoriou 910, Dion, Pieria, Central Macedonia, Greece
- Type: Archaeological museum

The Archaeological Museum of Dion (Greek: Αρχαιολογικό Μουσείο Δίου) is a museum in Dion in the Pieria regional unit of Central Macedonia, Greece.

The museum was established in 1983 to display excavations unearthed in the area from a fortified city that once stood in its place from the 6th century BC to the 5th century AD. The artifacts of the museum were also discovered in Olympus, the archaeological site of ancient Leivithra and the wider Pieria regional unit.

The shown finds are witnesses of the history of Pieria.

The rector of the University of Thessaloniki, Georgios Sotiriadis, began the first excavations from 1928 to 1931. The work was resumed by Georgios Bakalakis 30 years later. From 1973, under the direction of Professor Dimitrios Pandermalis, larger areas of the city were excavated. The work is still continuing under the direction of the University of Thessaloniki. The museum contains many items from when the Romans lived in the area, including statues, architectural members, votive and grave monuments, coins, and many other objects found in the necropolis, the sanctuaries, and baths of the ancient city on site. The water organ, the Statue of Dionysos, Isis and Aphrodite Hypolympidia and the Asklepios Daughters are displays of particular note.

== Interior ==
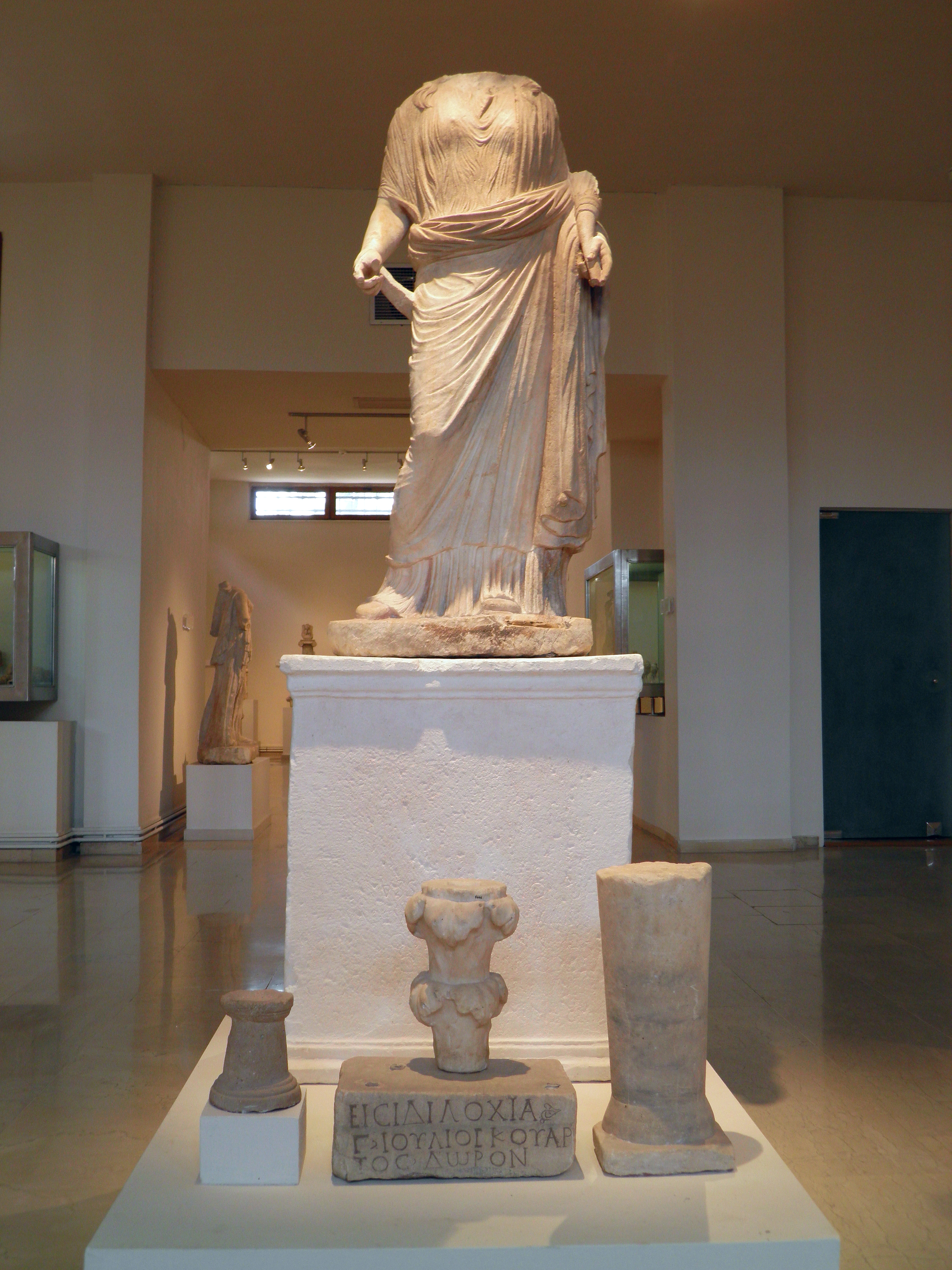
Statue of Isis–Tyche and marble votives offerings from the 2nd century AD.

On the ground floor of the museum are a number of important statues, including the Statue of Dionysos, the Asklepios Daughters and many others found in the ancient baths. The votive statues of Isis and Aphrodite Hypolympidia, were unearthed from the Sanctuary of Isis. The heads of Demeter were also found in the sanctuary. The museum also contains notable exhibits from the necropolis, including further votive offerings found in Macedonian tombs and a wide collection of wooden figurines.

The ground floor also displays the remains and objects found on the sites of early Christian basilicas, and a notable collection of coins. Notable coins include a gold stater of Philip II, depicting the head of Apollo and a racing chariot with two horses, and a silver tetradrachm of Alexander the Great and a head of Heracles and the Zeus Olympios. A small cinema shows a multilingual video about the history of the excavations at Dion. Professor Pantermalis informs about the past, present and the future of the ancient site.

The basement of the museum is devoted to objects excavated which relate a significant amount of information about the daily life of the people of ancient Dion, with objects used by them in daily life, and also includes more statues and items of worship from the surrounding regional unit. The museum has a wide selection of vases and jugs, ancient keys and locks, and stone processing tools such as hammers and chisels. A number of notable mosaics were also discovered in a complex known as the Dionysos House. Of particular note is the item known as the Mosaic of Dionysus, as well as the hydraulis or water organ, given its own room on the upper floor. It is the first organ of its kind found in Greece and the oldest found to date anywhere in the world. The organ was described by Hero of Alexandria and Vitruvius.

On a stone slab there are also the remains of an alliance agreement between the Macedonian king Philip V and the citizens of Lysimacheia in Thrace.

== Statues and other finds of the sanctuaries, churches and houses ==
=== Large thermal baths - Asklepios sanctuary ===
Among the remains of the great thermal baths were several statues representing Asklepios, the healer and protector of the body, and parts of his family. Next to his wife Epione were statues of his sons Podaleirios and Machaon. From his daughters, statues of Hygieia, Panakeia, Akeso and Iaso were found.

=== The Isis sanctuary ===
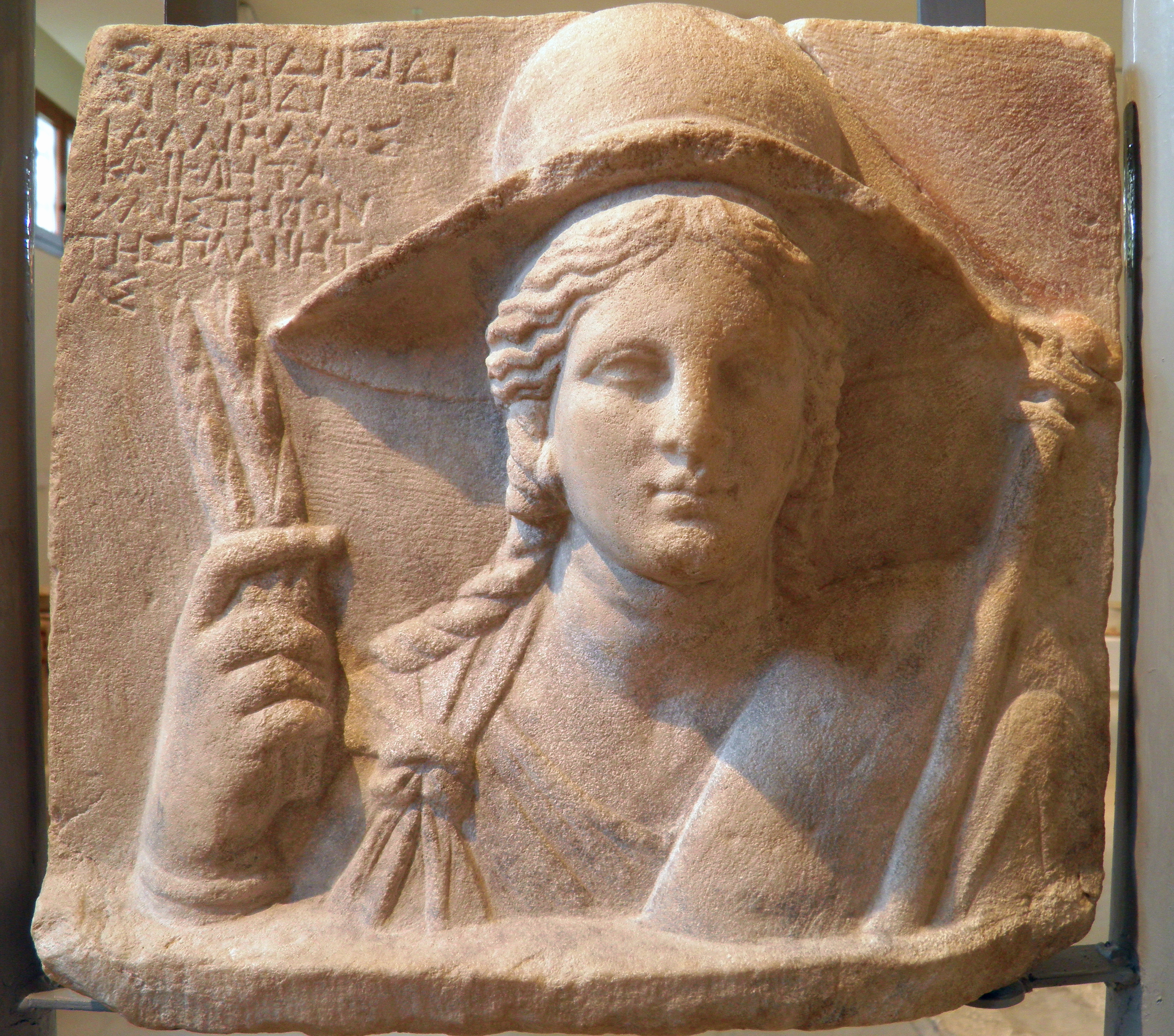
Relief of Isis-Demeter from the sanctuary of Isis, Hellenistic period.

From the second century BC, The Isis cult began to replace the Artemis cult. There were statues of Isis Tyche, Isis Lochia, the goddess of birth, and Aphrodite Hypolympidia. A statue of Julia Phrougiane Alexandra stood upright on the base of the excavations. Furthermore, statuettes of Harpokrates, the companion of the Isis, and stone tables showing footprints of different sizes (possibly of men and women) are exhibited. In addition to the representations of persons, one found the upper part of a well frame as well as cult objects such as a millstone, a fruit press and a small altar.

=== The Demeter sanctuary ===
It is the oldest sanctuary in Dion to date, and dates back to the 6th century BC. On the site, cult objects, clay figures, lamps, vases and coins were found. Exhibited in the museum are parts of statues from different eras. Thus a head of the Demeter from the 4th century BC, And a head of Aphrodite from the 1st century. AD. The Roman copy of a statue of Artemis (original from the 4th century BC) was found in the spring of the river Baphyras and is exhibited under the designation "Artemis Baphyria".

=== Sanctuary of Zeus Olympios ===
A statue of Perseus, the last king of Macedon (reign from 179 to 168 BC), and stone writing plaques are exhibited in the museum.

- A letter of King Antigonus Gonatas to Agasikles. The 16 lines of the letter from the 3rd century BC, the treatment of a dispute between Noumenios and his children. It was about the use and possession of a large plot.
- A letter King Philips V to the magistrate of Dion from the year 180 BC, Eurylochos, was urged to recognize the religious status of the city of Cyzicus in Asia Minor as a religious place. At that time a religious place was not subject to any secular rule.
- Fragments of a writing tablet (around 200 BC) confirming an alliance between King Philip V and the citizens of Lysimacheia. On the fragments is written the oath which was given by the ambassadors of the citizenship of Lysimacheia. Another fragment refers to a condition of the alliance, namely, the prohibition of alliances with one of the two pacting parties hostile camps.
- A letter of king Philip V (206-205 BC) to the citizens of the Thessalian cities Pherrai and Demetrias. It defines the border between the two cities on the basis of specific local conditions.
- Confirmation of an alliance between King Perseus and the Boeotians (172 BC). From this connection Perseus promised support against the Romans. The Roman historian Livy noted that there are three stone steles on which this pact was written down. One of them stood in Thebes, the center of Boeotia. a second stele stood in Delphi and a third in a famous place whose name was not handed down. The discovery of the missing, third stele in Dion testifies to the importance of the city at that time.

=== The sanctuary of Zeus Hypsistus ===
Exhibited objects of this sanctuary are cultic statues of Zeus and Hera as well as two stone statuettes of sitting eagles.

=== Other exhibits ===
From early Christian times, stone reliefs, crucifixes and objects of the liturgy can be seen. From the Leda House, a fully preserved marble table, supported by a lion statue, is exhibited. In addition to numerous other statues and statuettes, a mosaic from the Villa of Dionysus is depicted, which represents a Medusa head in a circular frame.

== Coins ==
The most varied coins found in Dion during the excavation are displayed. Among them was the gold stater, which was the most important currency of the Balkans and of Europe and had a value of two gold drachms. The silver four drachma coin (τετράδραχμον), which Alexander the Great minted, was common throughout the East of his empire. A chart on the lower floor of the museum shows on a time axis the respectively marked coins in connection with the ruling kings of Macedonia.

The predominant material for coin production was silver. It was mainly heavy, precious, silver coins, of which pieces were found in Mesopotamia, Egypt or the Levant, and also smaller coins, thought to for the payments of daily life, were minted.

In addition to the usual means of payment, coins showing gods such as Zeus, Athene or Artemis were found.

=== Macedonian Coinage ===
In northern Greece, coins were introduced as an exchange medium quite early. Due to precious metal mines on the Chalkidiki peninsula and the Pangaion Mountains, enough raw materials were available for the coinage. In the first half of the 5th century BC, Alexander I established the coinage in the Macedonian kingdom. The main reason for this step was to pay taxes to the Persians. By expanding his kingdom to the east, Alexander I brought more mines, in the vicinity of Philippi, under his control. The yield from these mines alone was estimated as a talent silver (about 26 kg) per day. Depending on the availability of the raw material silver, the coins were produced either from pure silver, or from a silver alloy with admixture of other metals. From the 5th century BC onwards, Two currencies existed in parallel. Heavy and valuable coins for foreign trade and smaller, lesser value, for payments within Macedonia. By the end of the fifth century, the smaller silver coins were gradually replaced by bronze coins. Phillip II continued to expand the Macedonian state, gaining control over other mines. Next to the minting-house in Pella, another, probably in Amphipolis, was built. From this time gold coins were also manufactured according to the Attic standard (see Attic talent) introduced by Philip II.

A special coin category is the so-called ghost coins (Greek δανακέ, danake). They consist of gold leaf and were put into the mouths of the dead to pay the ferryman Charon. This, according to Greek mythology, brought the dead across a river into the realm of Hades.

The pieces found in Dion and its surroundings date back to the 4th and 3rd centuries BC, Chr.

=== The Roman Coinage ===
After the emergence of the Roman Empire (31 BC) Rome secured the sole right to the coinage of gold coins. The Aureus was the only gold coin in circulation. It was used for payments in foreign trade and for the payment of high officials of the Roman state. As an internal currency, the denarius was in circulation. The production of silver coins in Macedonia was discontinued, possibly bronze coins for local trade were still produced. Also in Dion was a local minting area; during the excavations many of these coins were found.

A further innovation of the Roman coin was that for the first time all coins had a uniform appearance.

== The Hydraulis ==
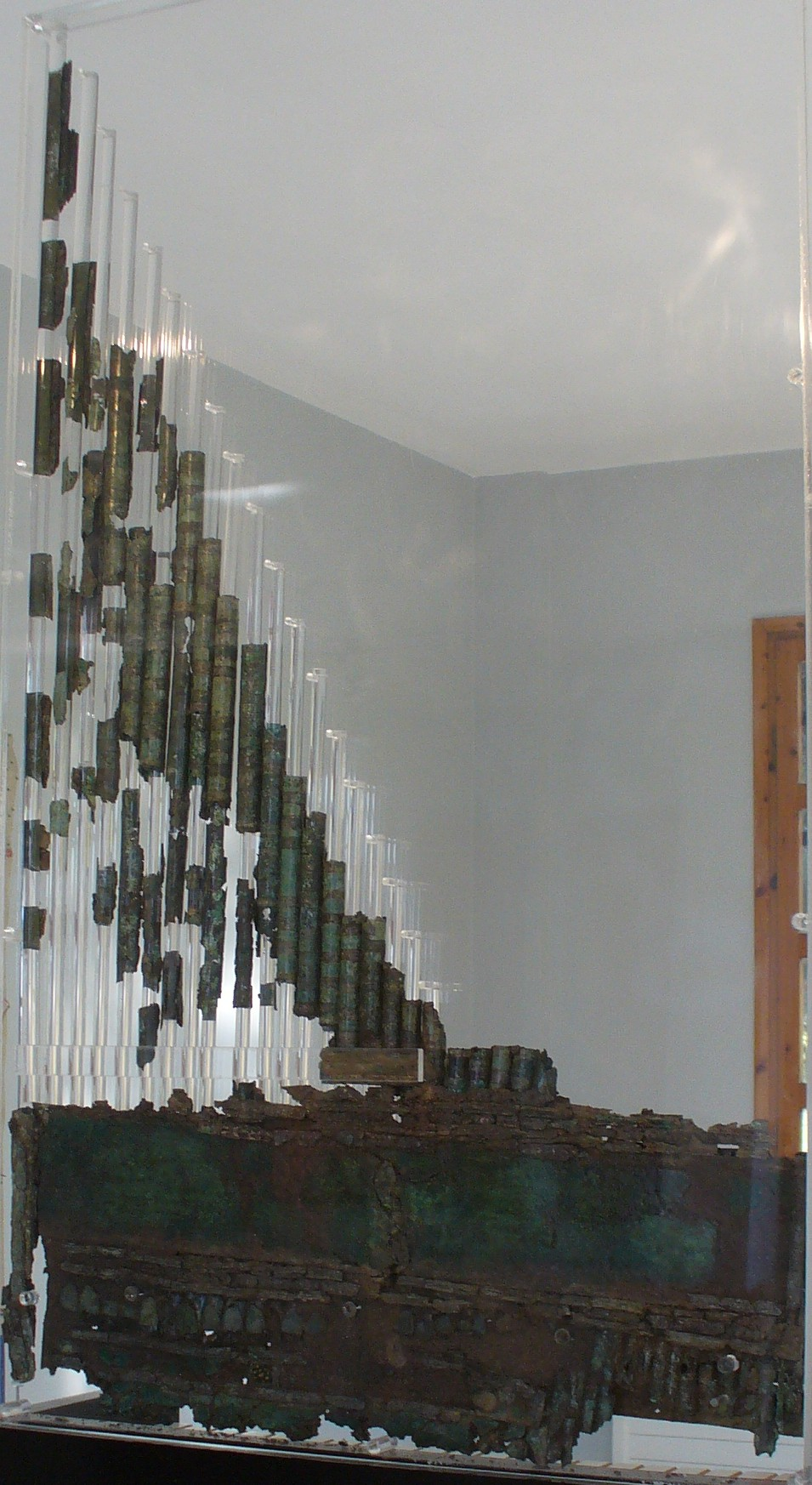
The Hydraulis of Dion

In the summer of 1992, the hydraulic organ (ὓδραυλις, hydraulis) was found in excavations within the remains of a building situated opposite the villa of Dionysos. It is one of the most important exhibits of the museum and dates from the 2nd century AD. It corresponds to the instruments mentioned by Heron of Alexandria and Vitruvius. The organ pipes are arranged in two rows and consist of 24 additional and 16 narrower pipes. They were decorated with silver rings. The body of the organ was decorated with silver stripes and multi-colored, rectangular glass ornaments. The instrument found in Dion is the only find of its kind in Greece and the oldest discovered specimen of its kind in the world.

== Tools and items of daily use ==
Construction materials such as floor tiles, roof tiles, bricks, clay and lead pipes are exhibited. Pottery household vessels, containing oil or wine, were produced with the help of pottery wheels and burnt in kilns. The processing traces of various tools are illustrated on marble pieces. A variety of different chisels are displayed, in addition to which one can directly see the effects of processing the material on the marble. A small loom illustrates how fabrics were made. Mortars and pestles are exposed on stone tools.

A plow from the third century AD, which was found south of the Hellenistic theater, should be mentioned separately. From the 1st century BC, a hand scale was found which was very finely adjustable. Also from the 1st century BC, is a speculum, an instrument used for gynecological examinations.

A model of the hypocaust shows how the thermal baths of the city were heated.

== Exhibits from the surrounding area ==
=== Excavation Pigi Athinas ===
This excavation lies at the eastern foot of the lower Olympus. The presence of people was proofed from the first half of the 7th millennium BC. First settlements date from the time of the Middle and Late Neolithic Period (5600 - 4500 BC). Some thousand years later (2100 - 1050 BC) hill graves (tumuli) were excavated. The central tomb was considerably larger and deeper than the surrounding tombs, indicating a special status of the deceased.

A Roman cemetery from the 4th century AD consists of 16 graves for 12 adults and 4 children. The numerous grave attachments (Kterismata) were completely preserved.

=== Excavations of Tribina ===
Named after the river Tribina (or Derbina), the remains of a settlement dating from the time around 2500 BC. were unearthed. From the Mycenaean era there are 24 tombs, in which either individual persons or up to three persons were buried. The tombs do not have a uniform shape, but they have grave attachments such as vessels, weapons and jewelry.

=== Excavation Pigi Artemidos ===
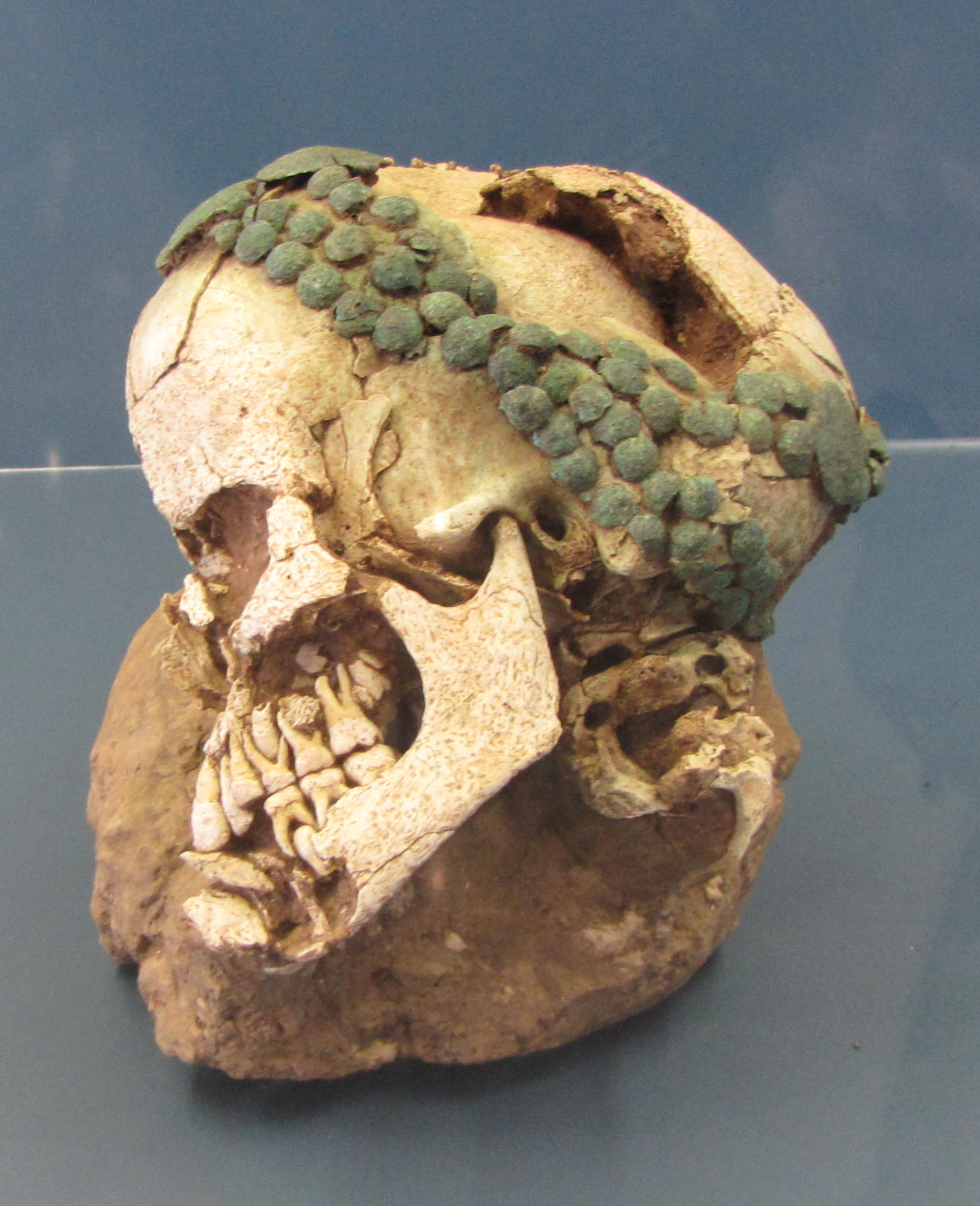
The sleeping girl

Located at the foot of Mount Olympus; The first traces of the presence of people dating around the middle of the 2nd millennium BC. A tumuli from the late Bronze Age was surrounded by a stone ring (10 m diameter). Within the hill grave nine separate graves were found. The tumuli was marked by the collection and arrangement of stones in a certain form (Sema).

=== The tombs of Katerini ===
Two graves (named grave "A" and grave "B") were discovered two kilometers north of Katerini. Grave "A" consists of two rectangular chambers with a marble door between the burial chamber and the antechamber. This type of Macedonian grave is the forerunner of the great Macedonian tombs because it lacks the artistic façade which is usually found in Macedonian tombs. It was covered by a flat roof. Grave "B" is smaller and has only one burial chamber. Though the graves were stripped long ago, impressive grave remains, exhibited in the Archaeological Museum of Thessaloniki.

=== The excavations of Pydna ===
Near Makrygialos, a skull of a girl was found during excavation from 1994 to 1996, in tomb 108. She had died quite young, because she had not yet a fully developed dentition. For her funeral, she was decorated with a bronze diadem, a bronze bracelet, three finger rings, a necklace, and metal fittings on her belt. Archaeologists gave her the name "sleeping girl." There were three Mycenaean clay vessels among the burial objects. Diadems of the kind the girl wore were very rare as burial gifts for girls or young women. They indicate the high social rank of the deceased.

== Outbuildings ==
=== The Archaiothiki ===
The Dionysus mosaic is exhibited in this building, which is located west of the museum and was completed in 2007. From a gallery the mosaic can be viewed from all sides. In showcases the visitor is presented the latest finds from excavations from Dion and surrounding ancient sites. A video informs about the dismantling of the mosaic at its site, the transport to the Archaiothiki and the subsequent restoration. The building was built especially for the exhibition of the Dionysus mosaic.

=== The laboratory ===
South of Archaeothiki is the scientific laboratory. It is operated by the Aristotle University of Thessaloniki.

=== Storage building ===
Southeast of the museum, archaeological finds from Dion, Leivithra and the surrounding area are stored in a long-stretched building. In a workshop, professional staff deal with the cataloging and cleaning of the finds. Repairs of broken pottery are performed on an all-round table.

== Literature ==
Dimitrios Pandermalis: "Dion. The archaeological site and the museum.", Athens 1997

- Free Travel Guide about the Olympus region Title: Mount Olympus - Ancient Sites, Museums, Monasteries and Churches

== Entry ==
The museum offers guided tours for young school children and has a room devoted to educational activities.

The Dion Archaeological Museum opens from Tuesday to Sunday at 8:00–19:00 and on Monday from 12:30–19:00 during the summer, and in the winter it opens on Monday–Friday from 8:00 to 17:00 and on a Saturday and Sunday from 8:00 to 14:30.

=== Free entrance days ===
- 6 March (in memory of Melina Mercouri)
- 18 April (International Monuments Day)
- 18 May (International Museums Day)
- The last weekend of September annually (European Heritage Days)
- 28 October
- Every first Sunday from 1 November to 31 March

== Gallery ==
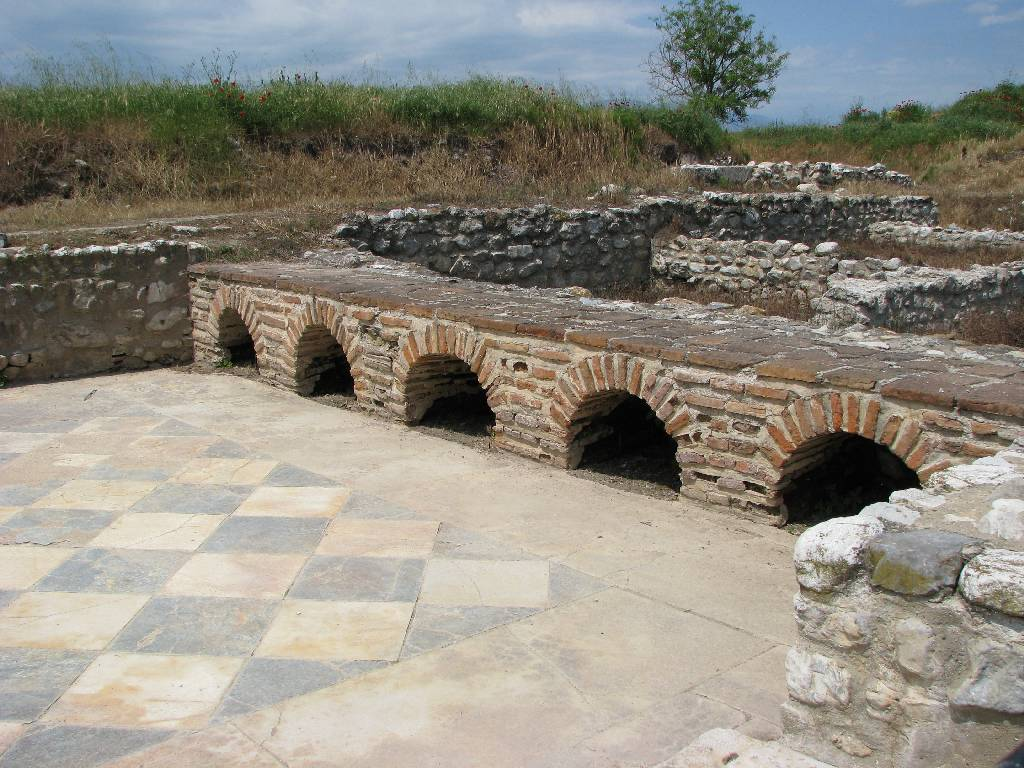
Baths of ancient Dion

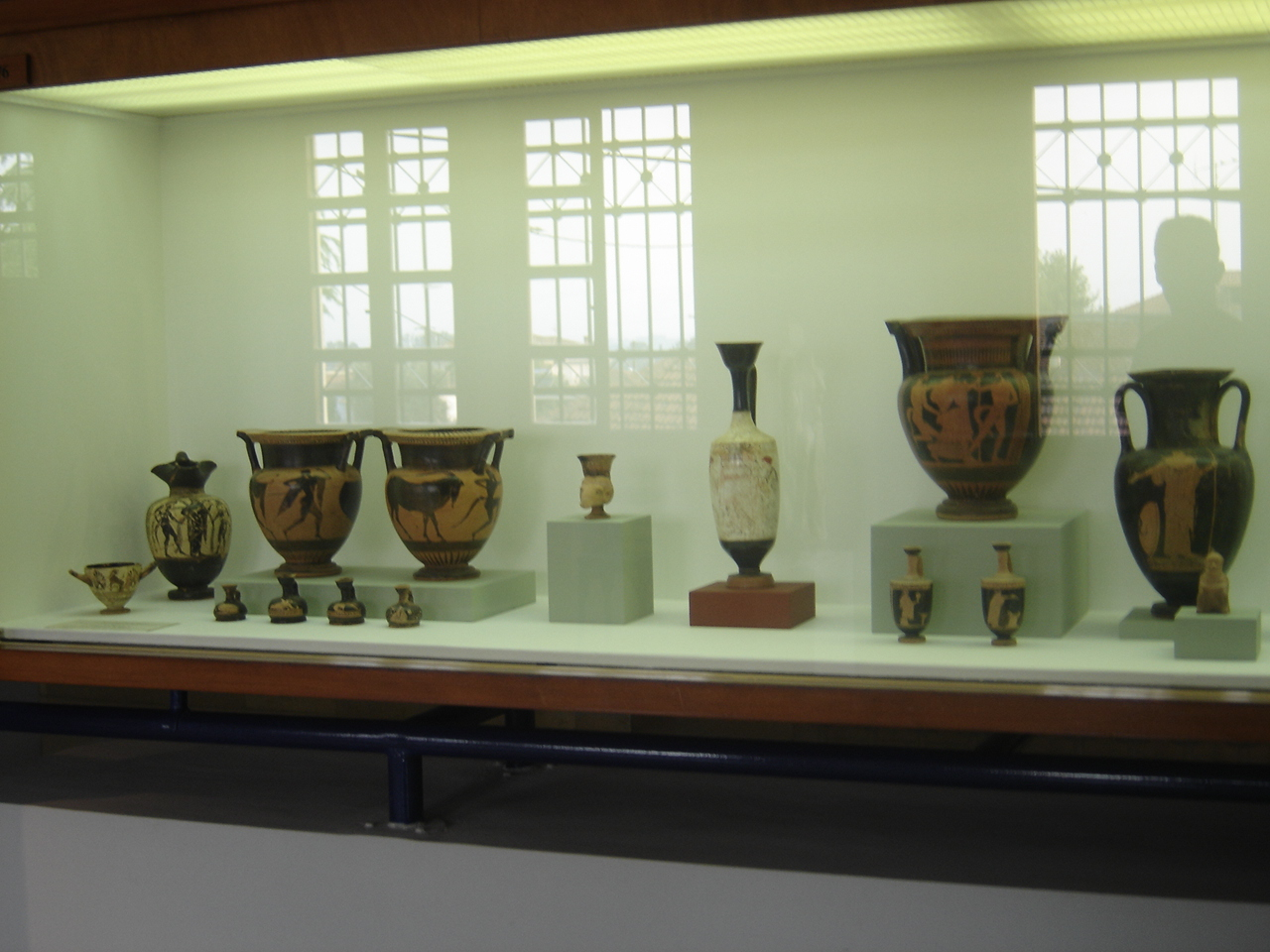
Internal view of the museum

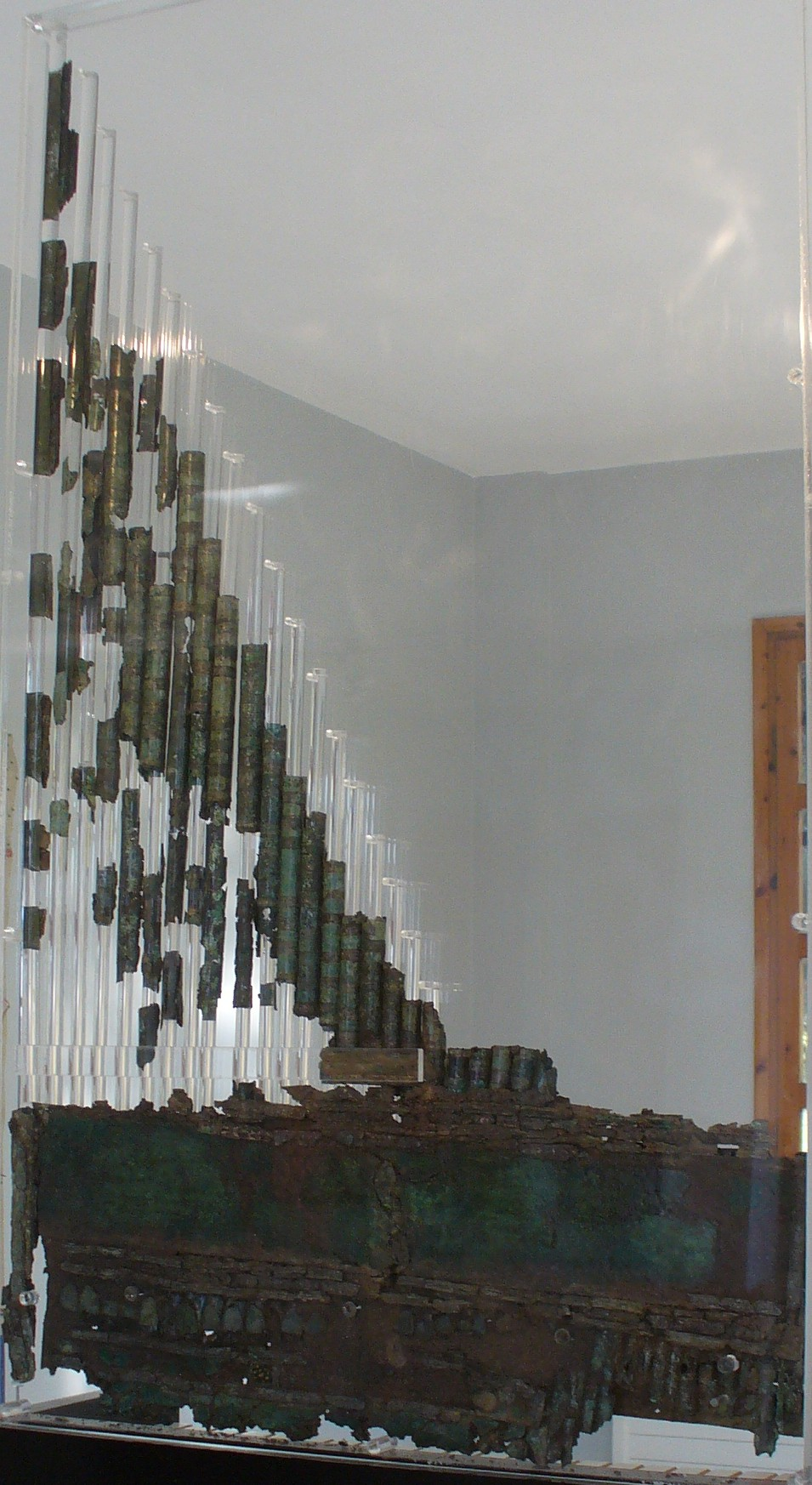
The ancient hydraulic organ

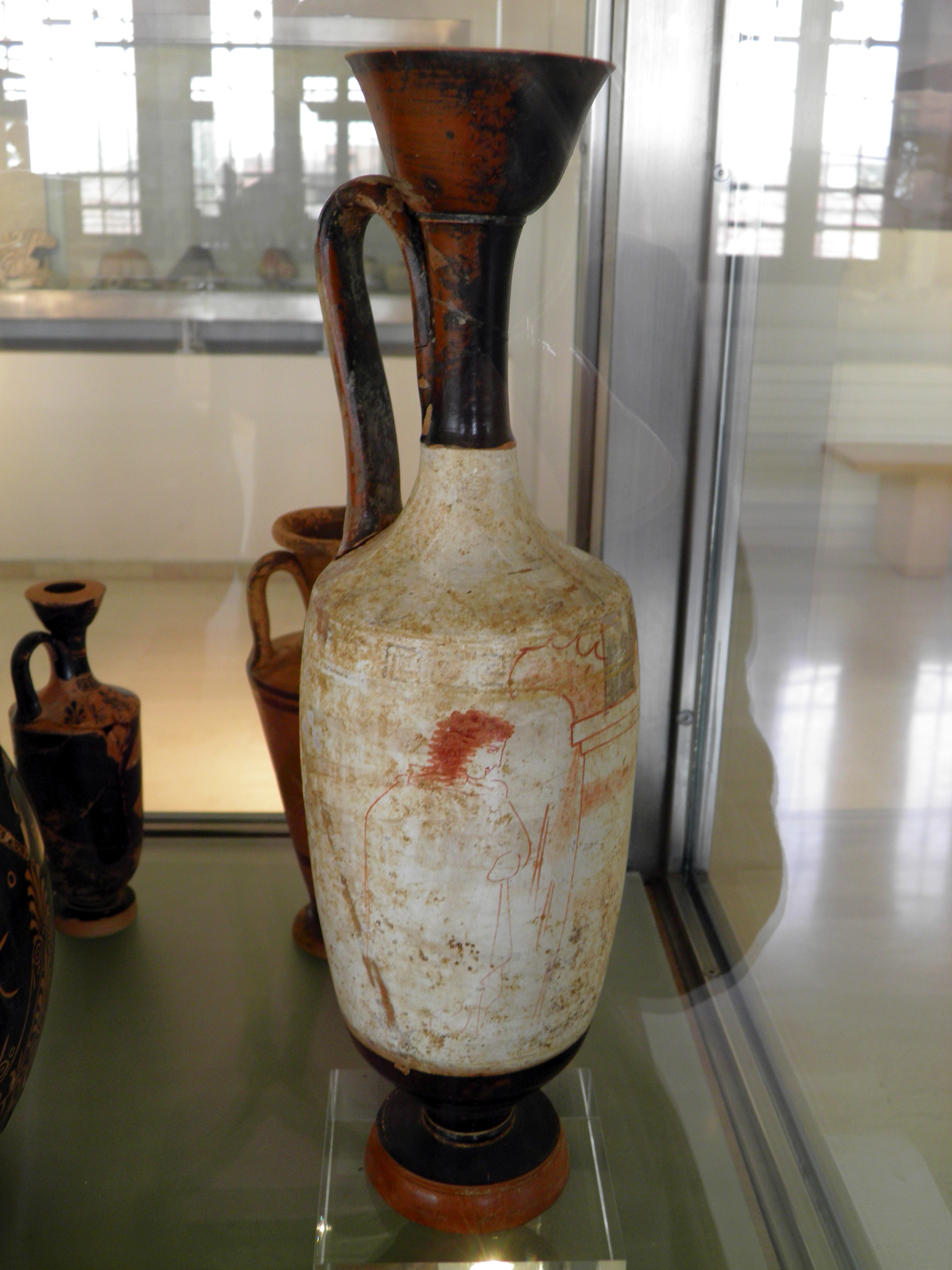
5th-century white lekythos from the cemetery at "Louloudia" of Kitros

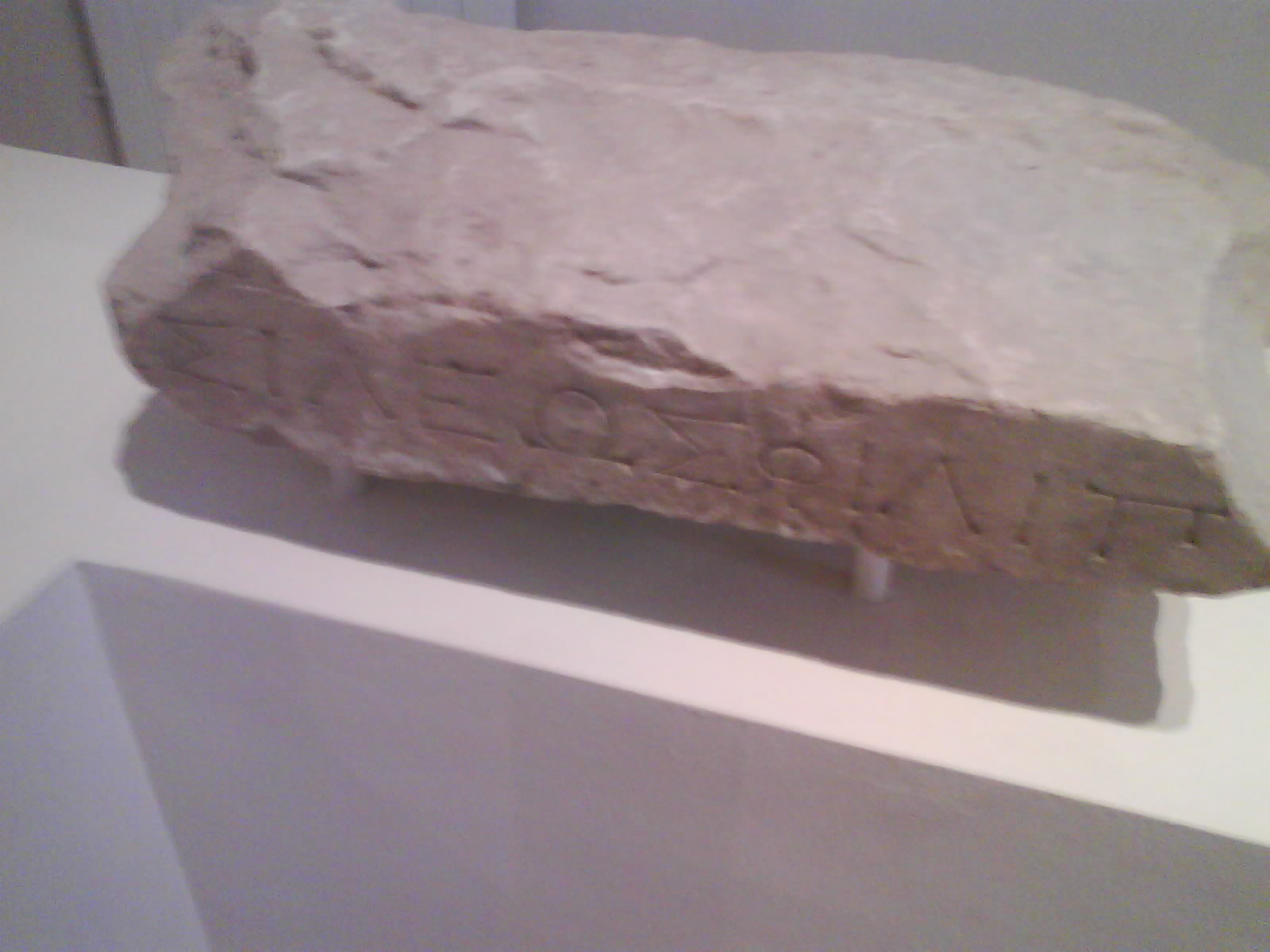
Inscription reading "ΒΑΣΣΙΛΕΩΣ ΦΙΛΙΠΠΟΥ" (King Philip)

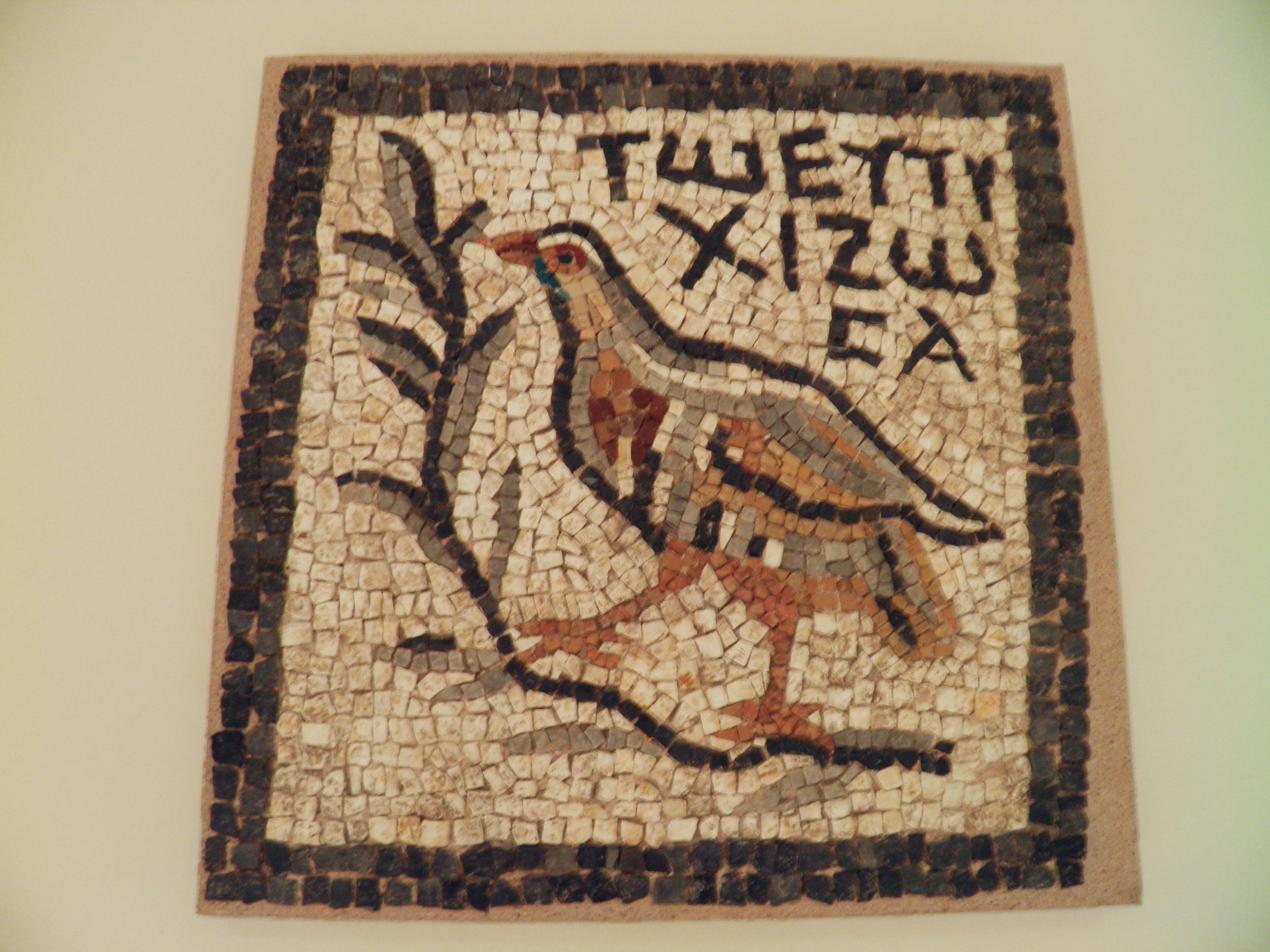
Mosaic depicting birds a grouse and inscription "for lucky Zosas", from the House of Zosas

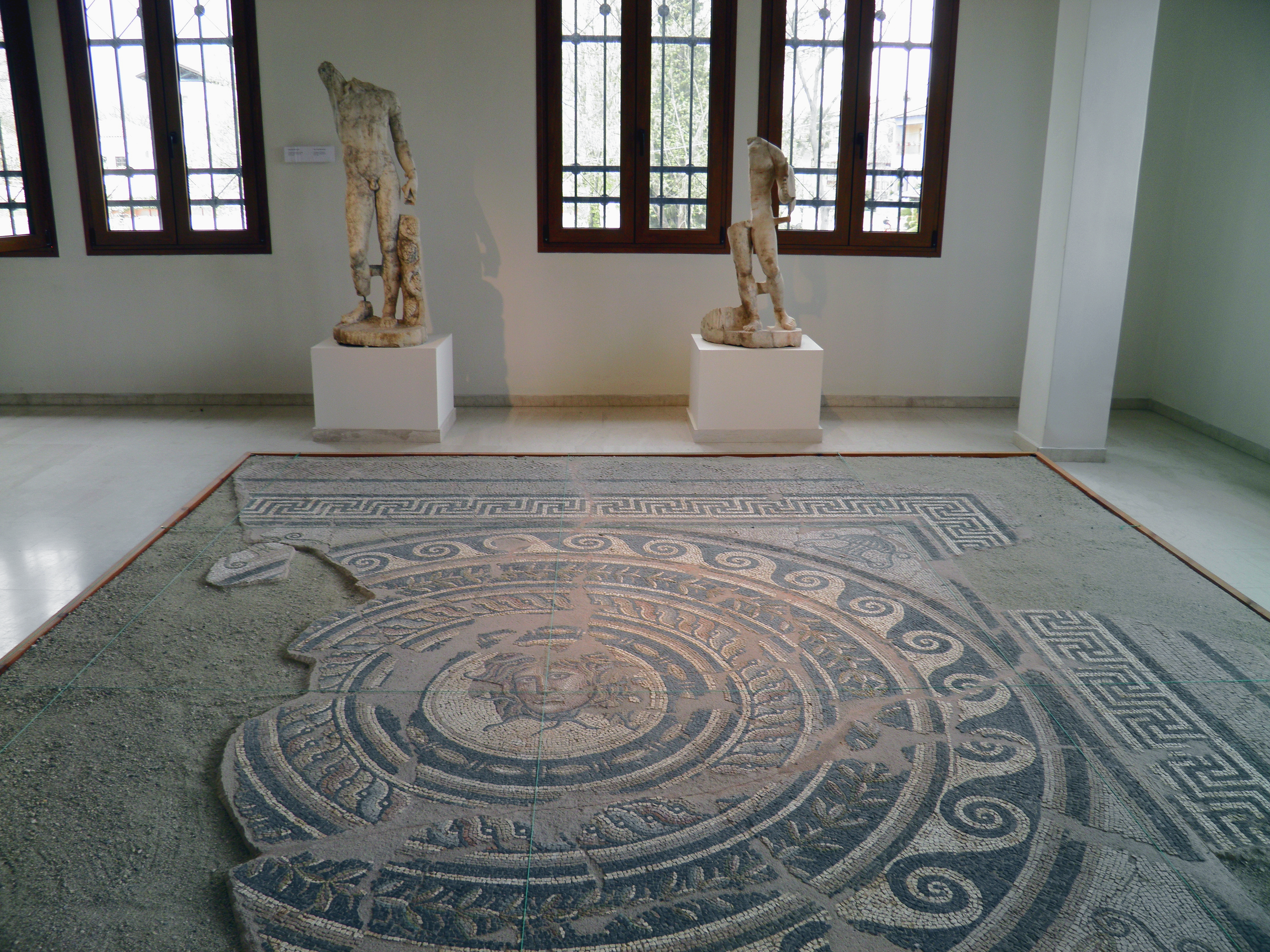
Mosaic floor from the Villa of Dionysos depicting Medusa's head

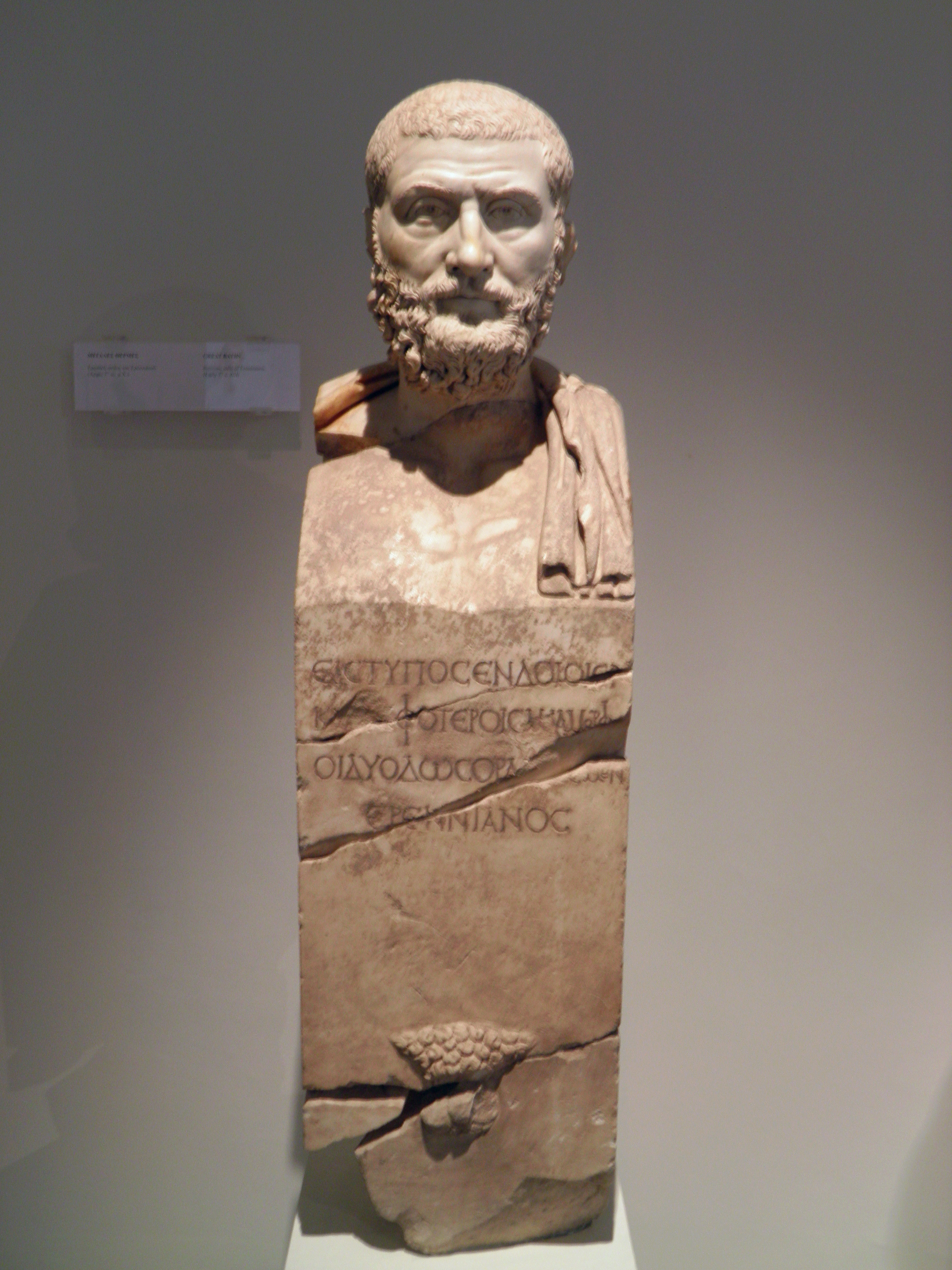
Hermaic stele of philosopher Erennianos

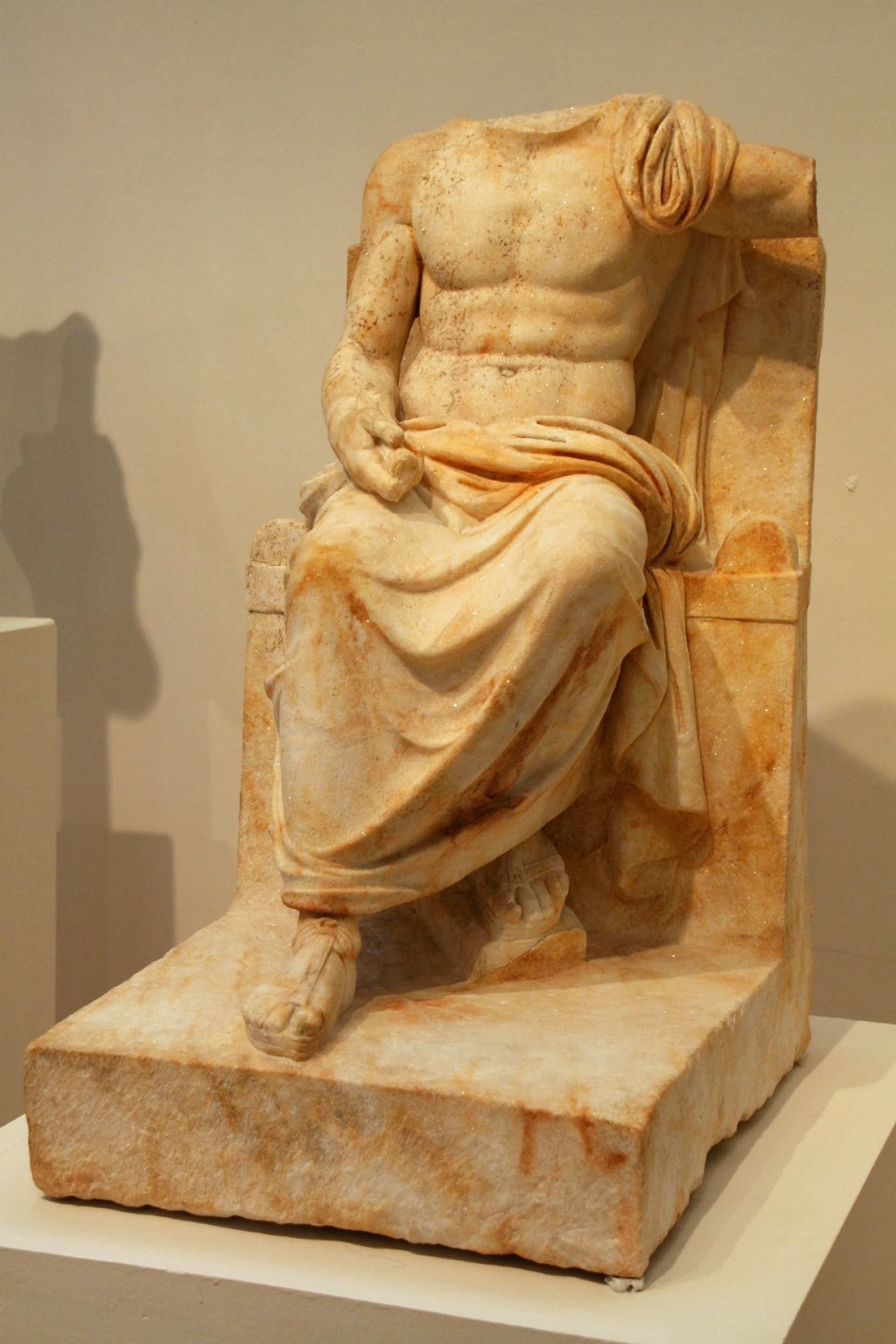
Cult statue of Zeus Hypsistos

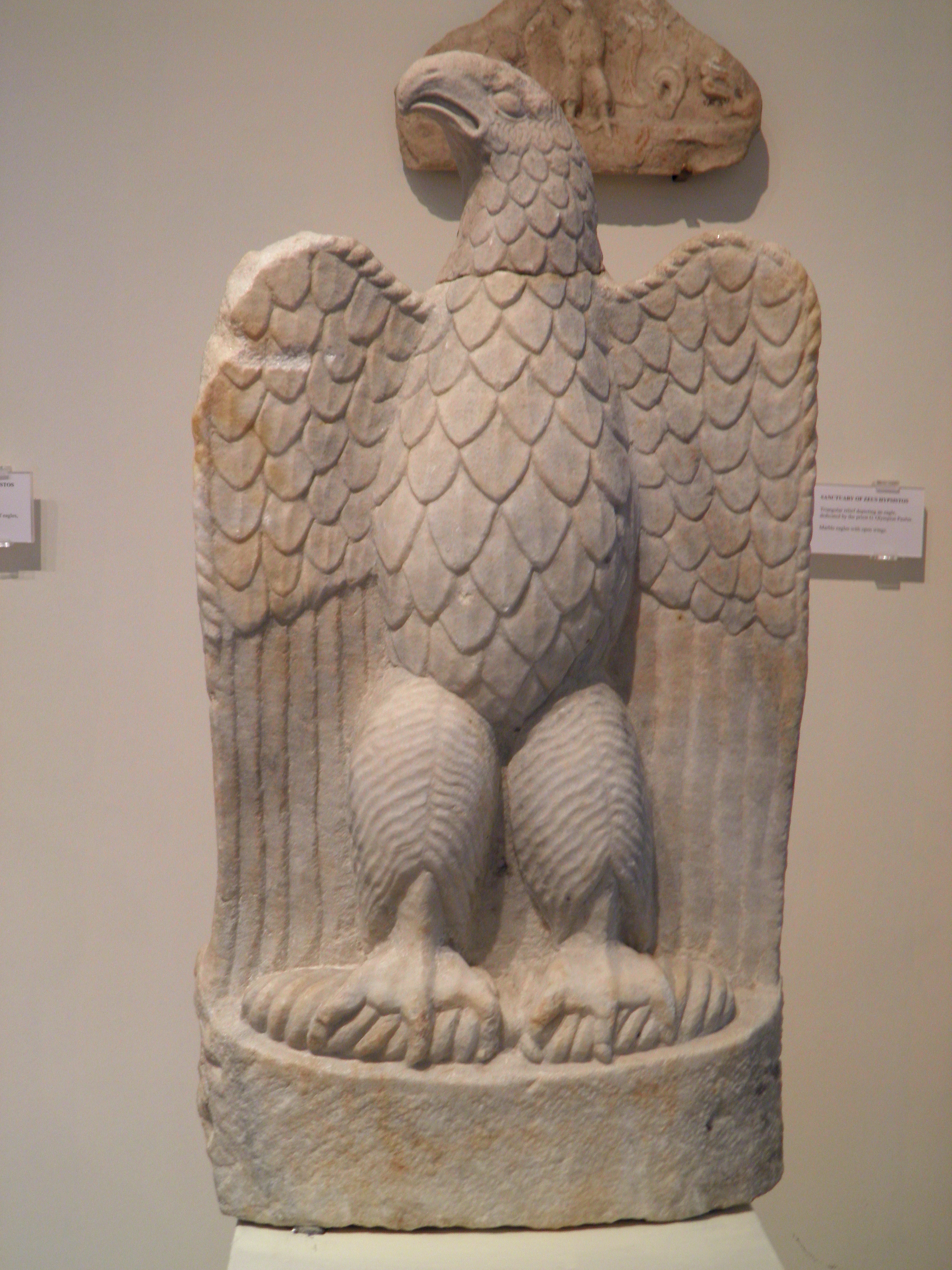
Marble eagle from the sanctuary of Zeus Hypsistos

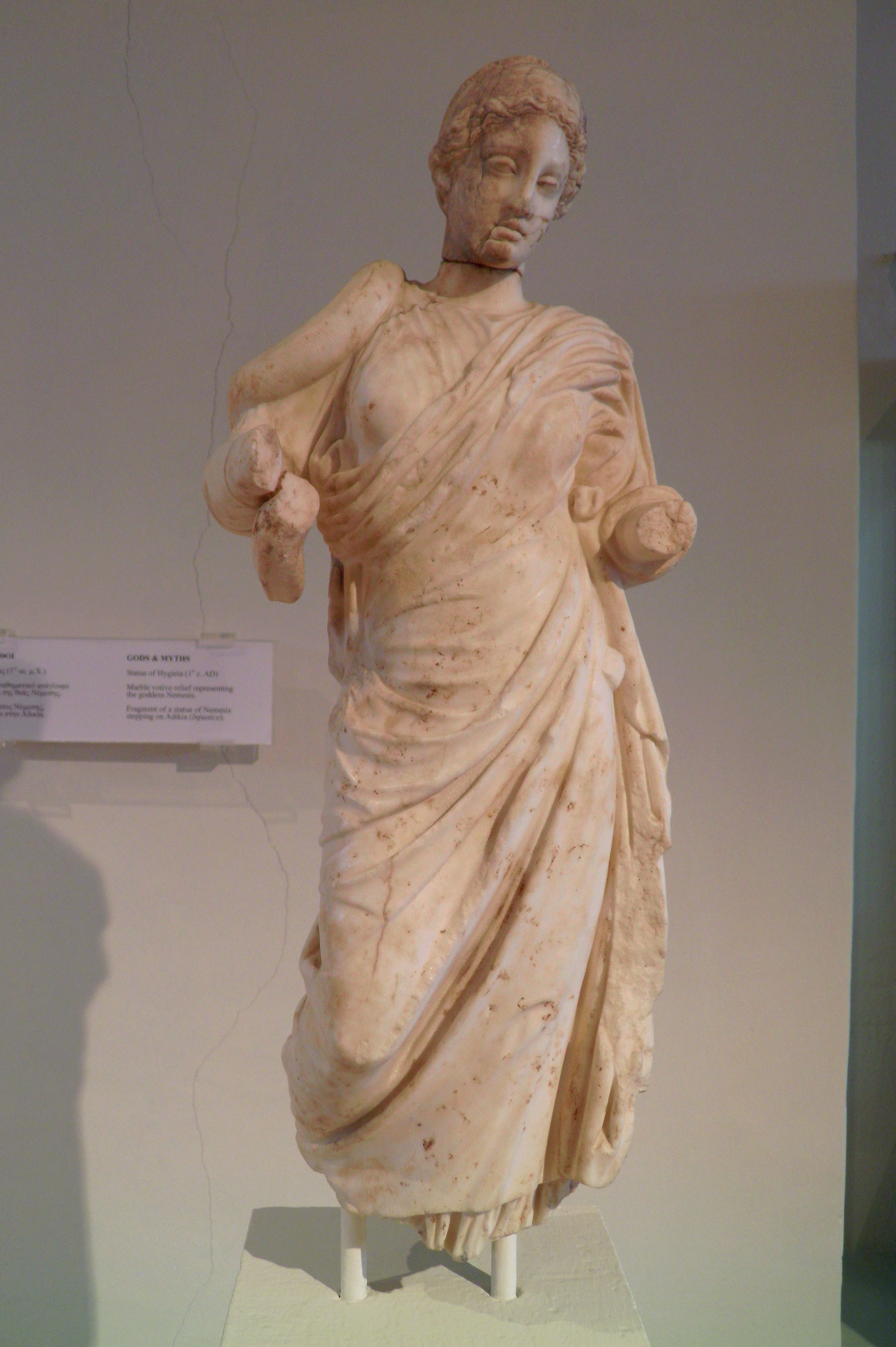
Statue of Hygieia (1st century CE)

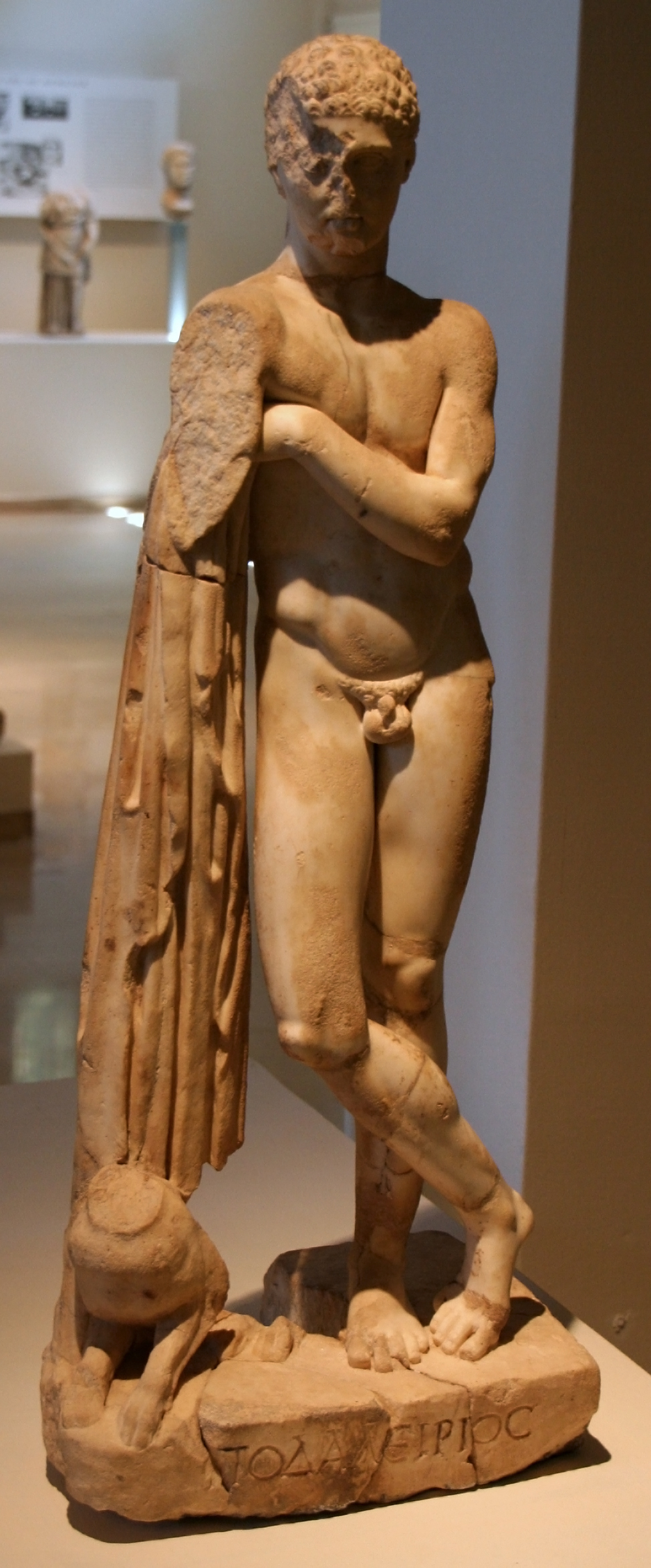
Statue of Podalirius, the young son of Asklepios

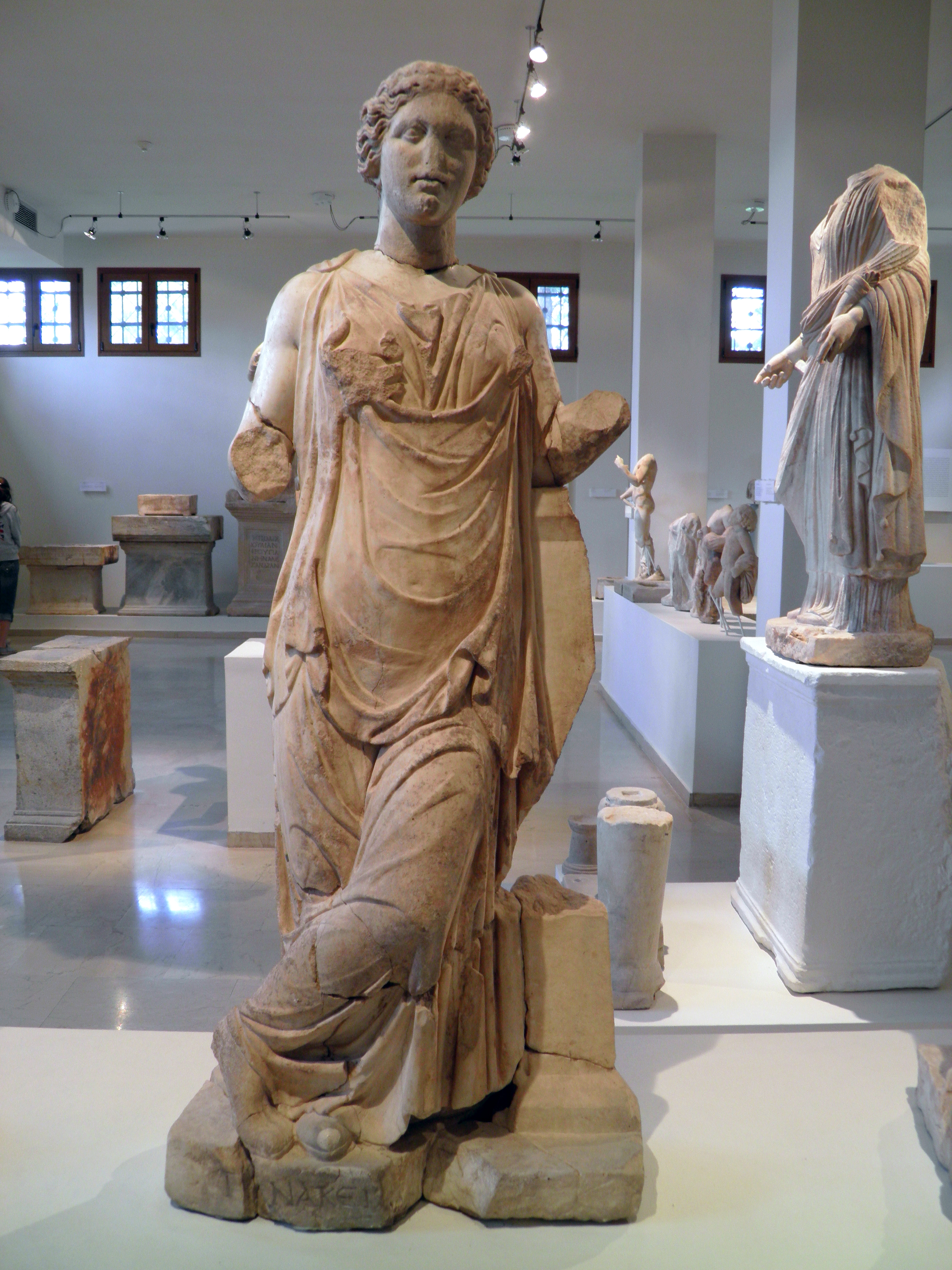
Children of Asclepius: Statue of Panakeia

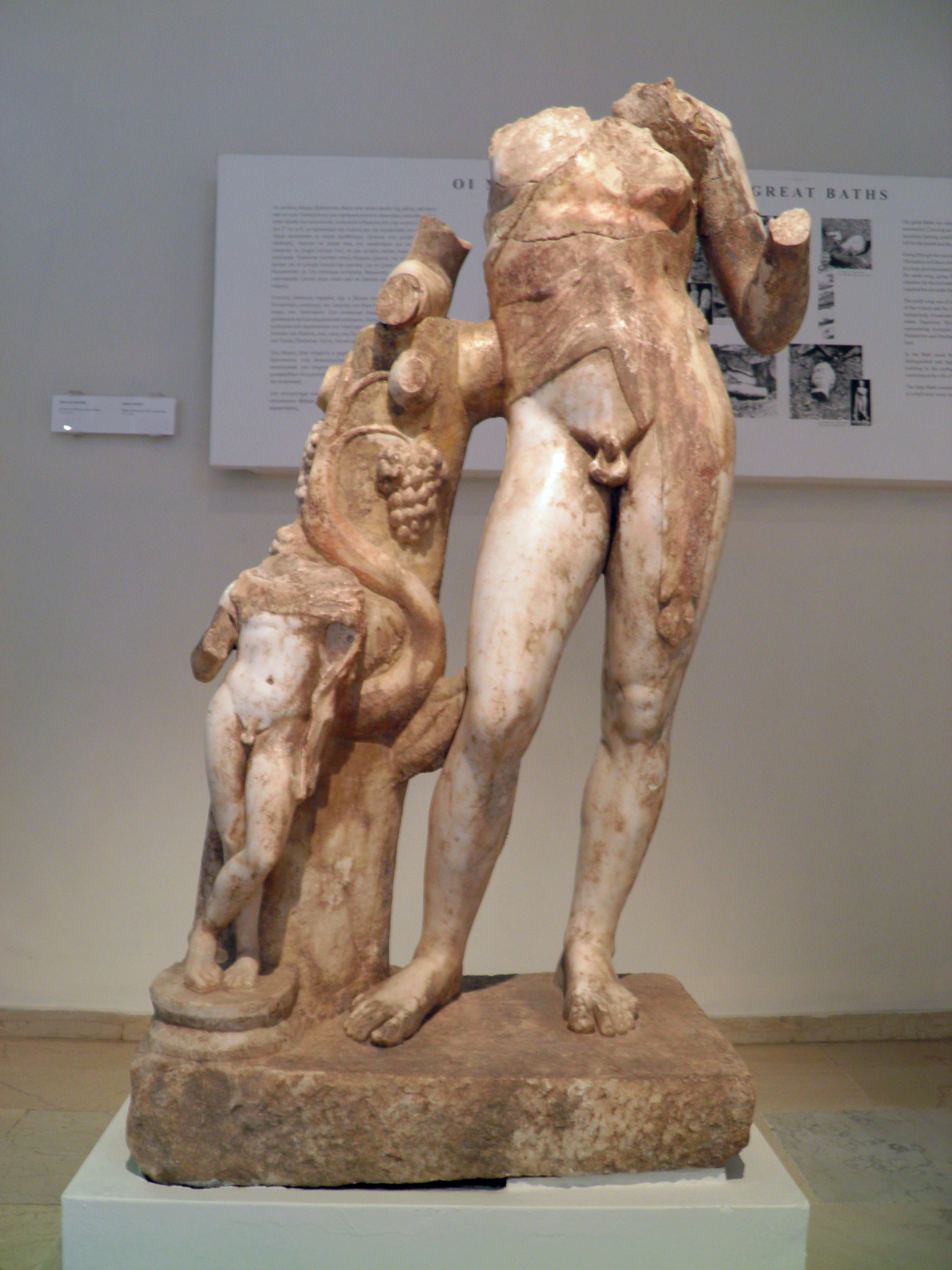
Statue of Dionysos from the frigidarium of the great baths

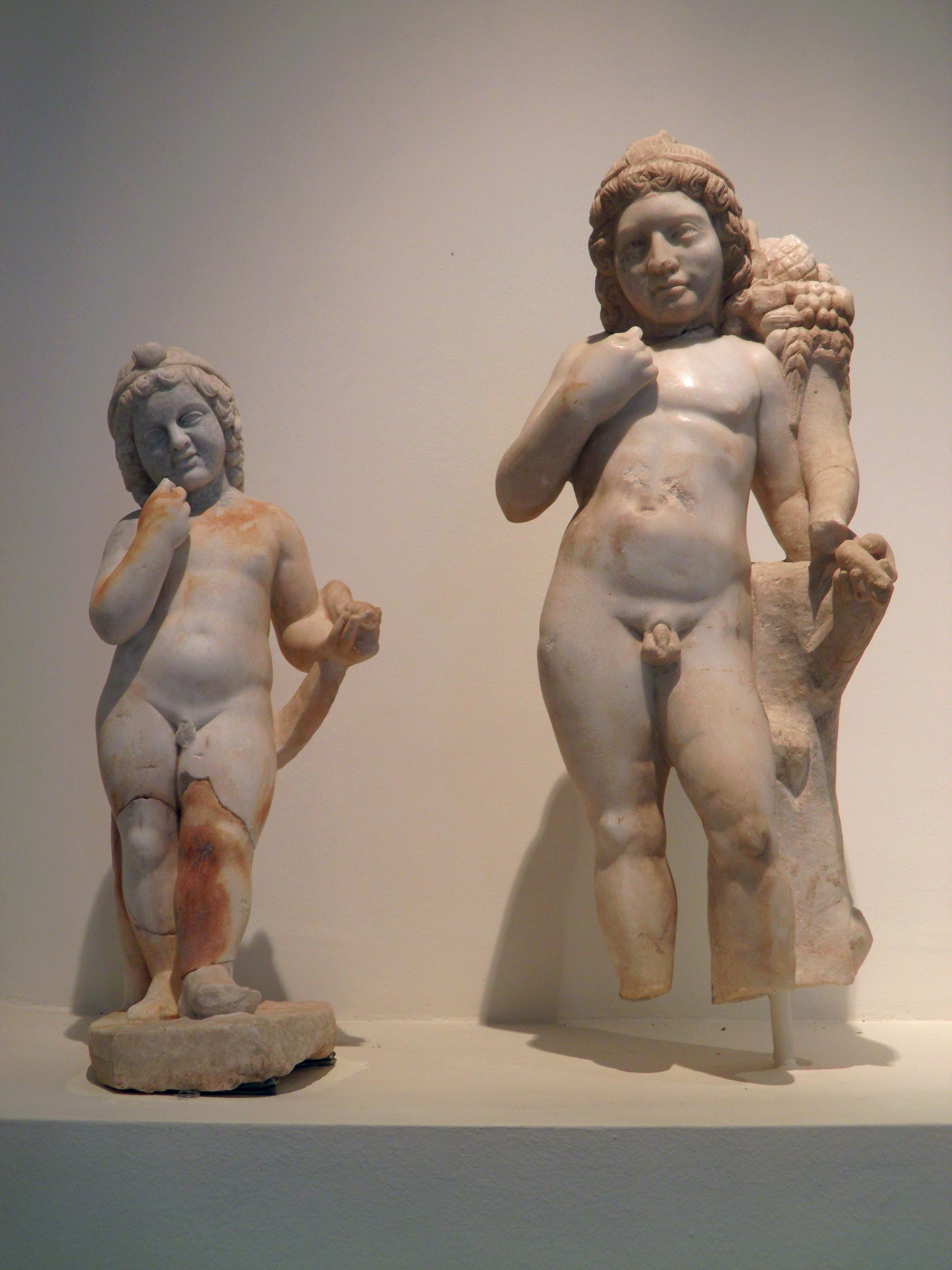
Statuettes of Harpocrates, the companion of Isis, from the sanctuary of Isis

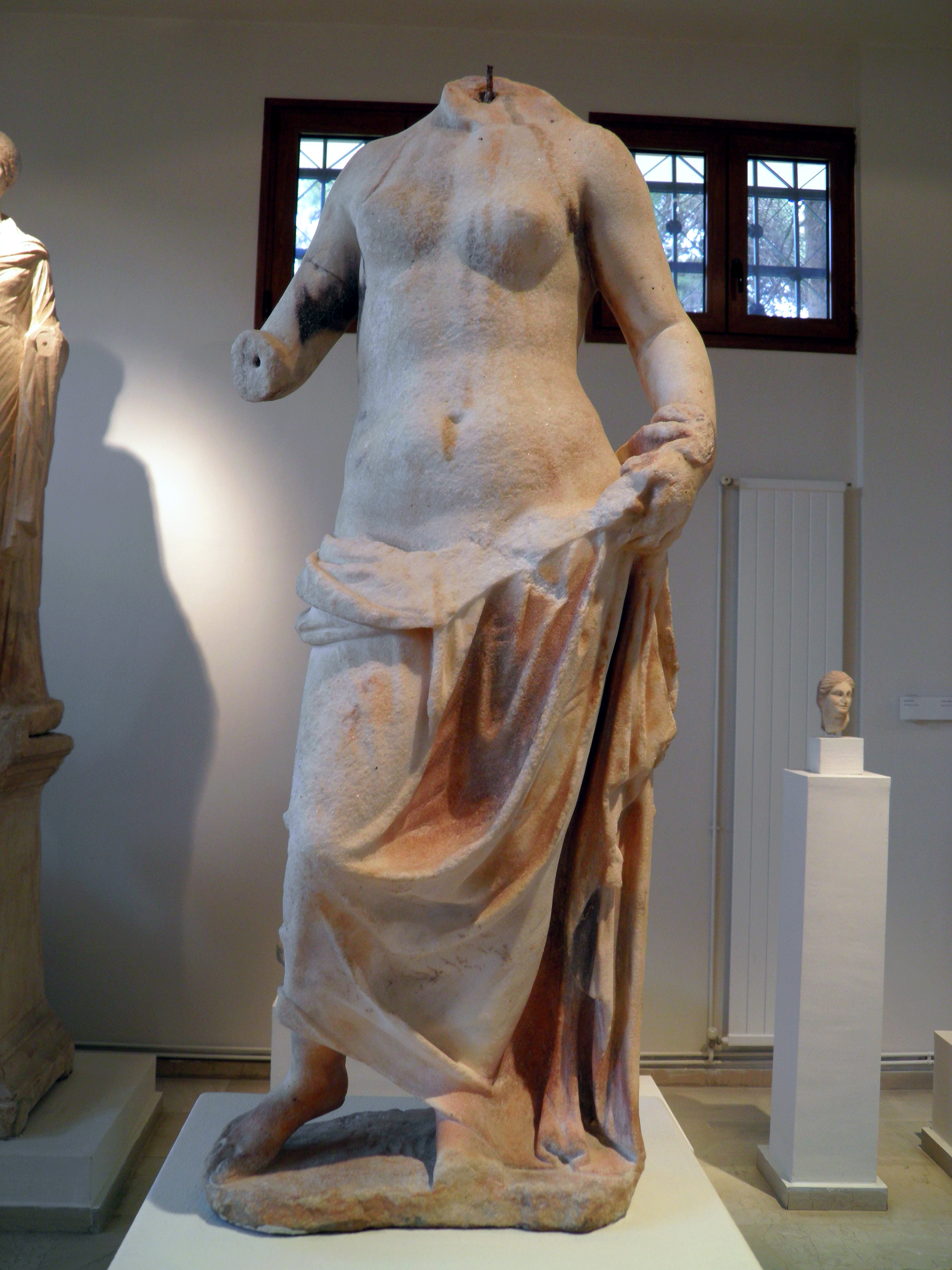
Statue of Aphrodite, from the sanctuary of Isis

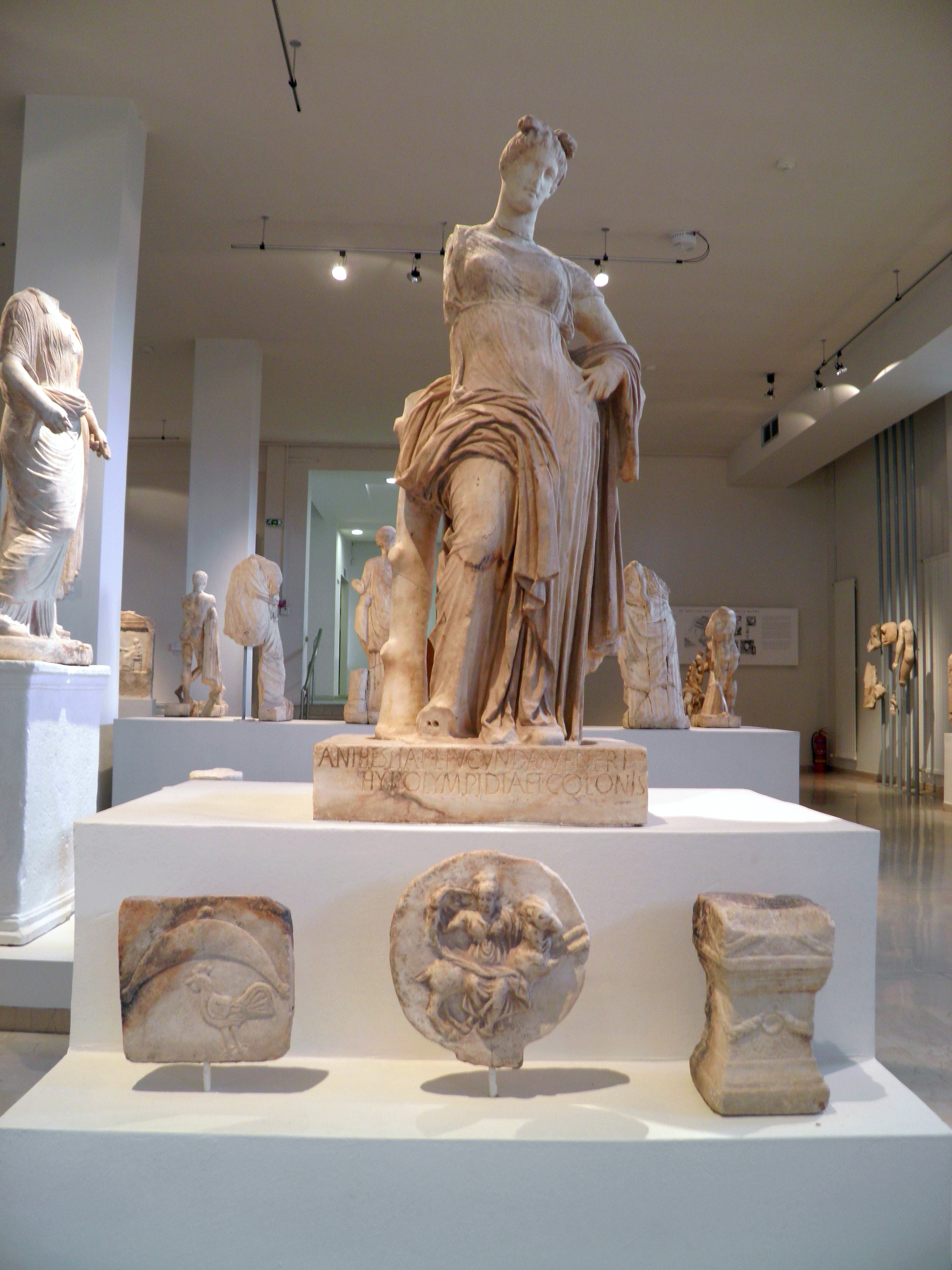
Marble cult statue of Aphrodite Hypolympidia and votive offerings

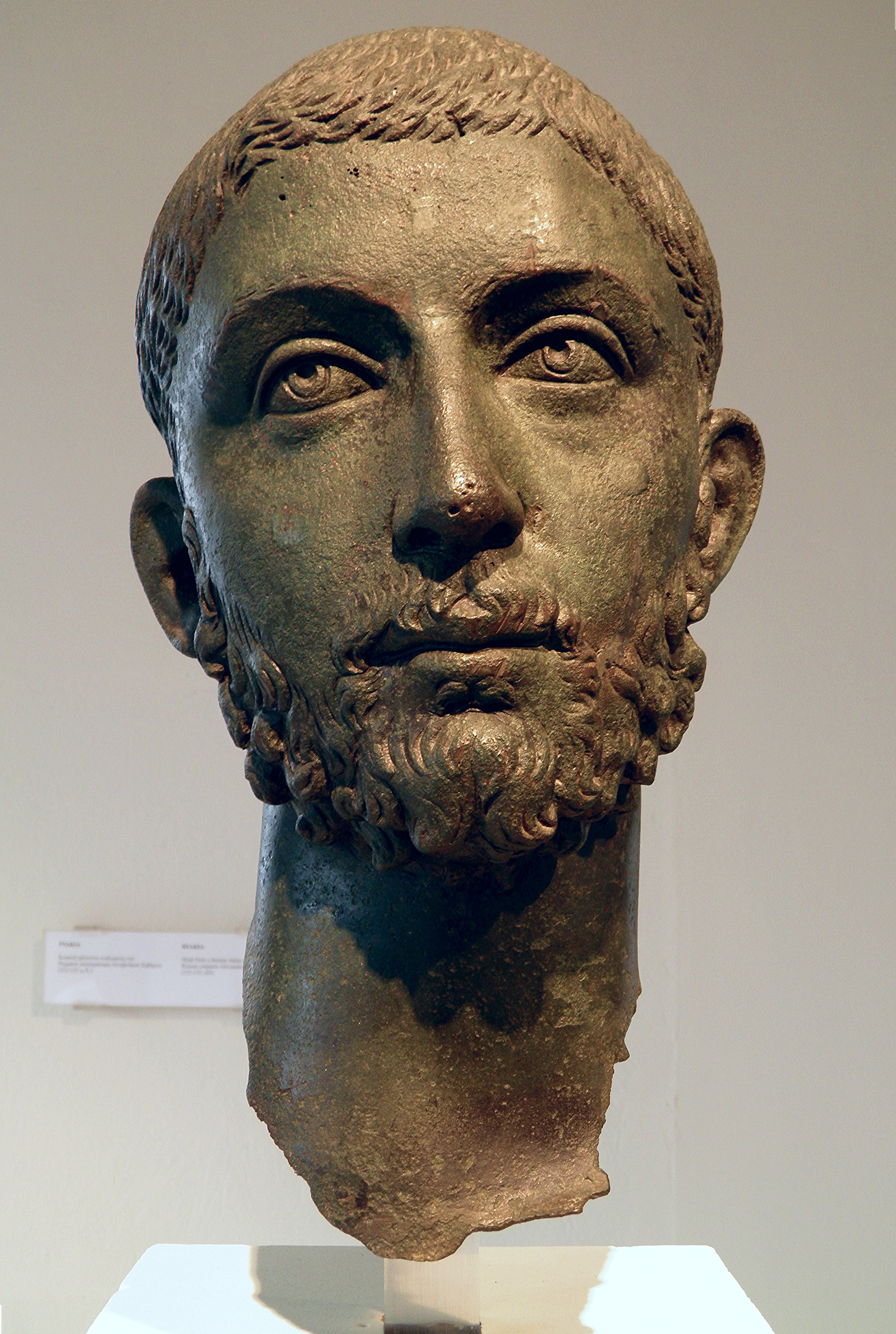
Head from a bronze statue of the Roman emperor Alexander Severus (222-235 AD)

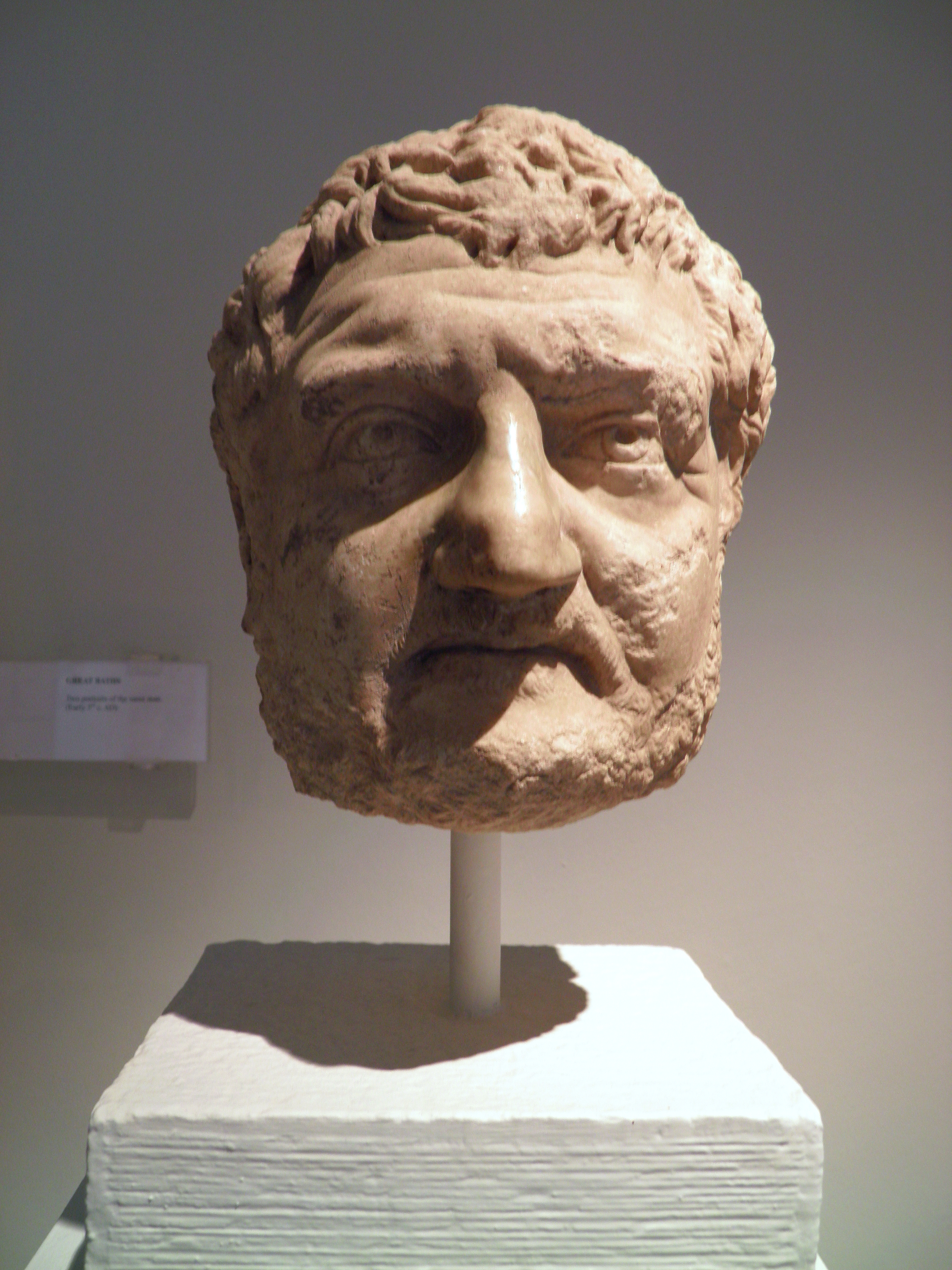
Bust of a man, from the great baths (early 3rd century AD)
