= Aphrodite Hypolympidia =

Statuette of Aphrodite in Dion, Greece

- Greek: Ἀφροδίτη Ὑπολυμπιδία
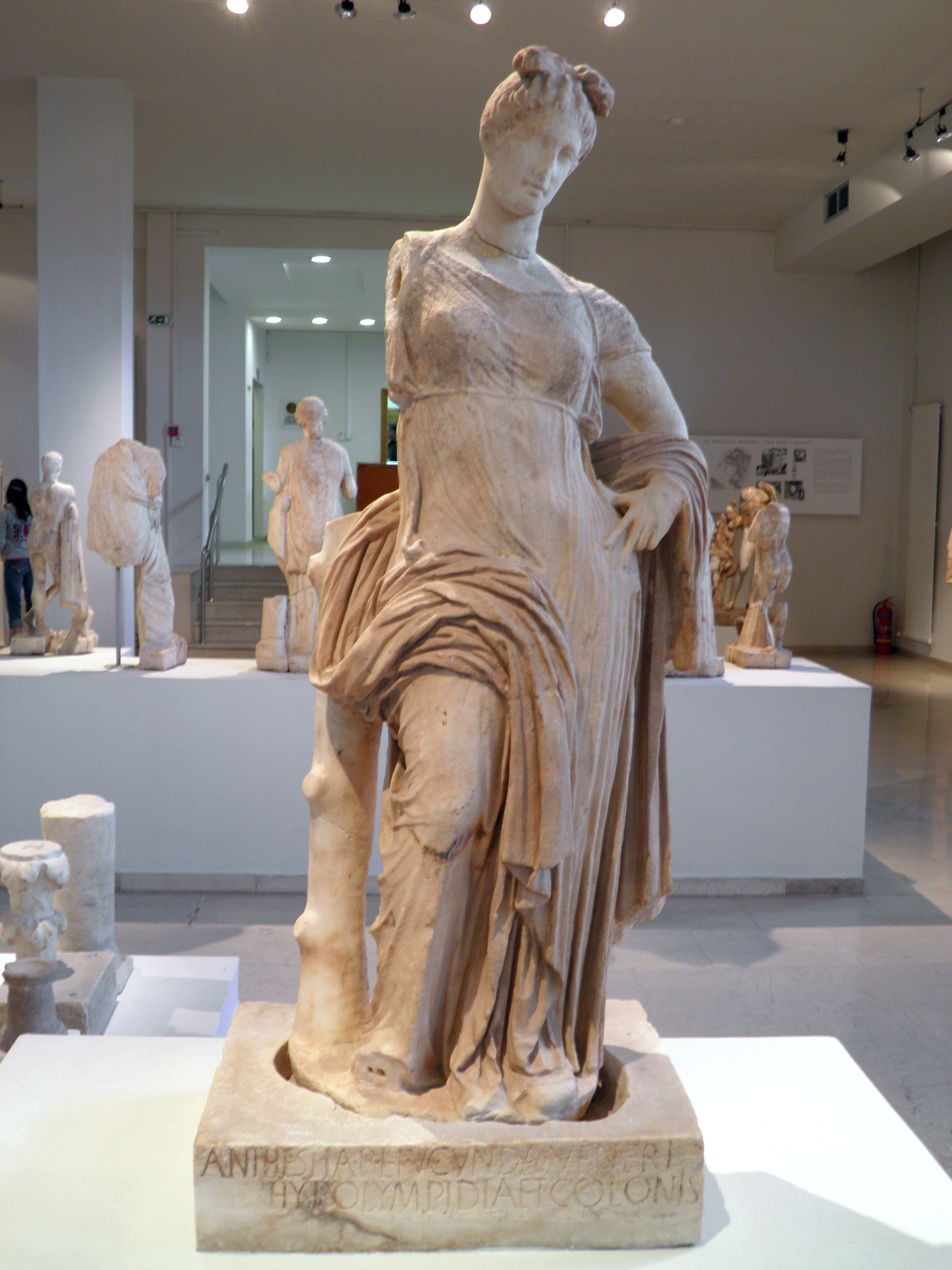
- The statue today in Dion
- Year: 2nd century BC
- Catalogue: No 383
- Medium: Marble
- Movement: Hellenistic
- Subject: the goddess Aphrodite
- Dimensions: 113 cm × 48 cm (44 in × 19 in)
- Condition: Three pieces
- Location: Archaeological Museum, Dion
- Owner: Greece

Aphrodite Hypolympidia (Ancient Greek: Ἀφροδίτη Ὑπολυμπιδία, romanized: Aphrodítē Hupolumpidía, lit. 'Aphrodite from below Mount Olympus') is a second-century BC smaller than lifesize Greek marble sculpture depicting Aphrodite, the Greek goddess of beauty and desire. It was discovered in the Temple of Isis in Dion, a town in the region of Macedonia in northern Greece. It is now exhibited in the Archaeological Museum of Dion with accession number 383.

== History ==
The statue was made around 150-100 BC, modeled after an over lifesize statue identified as Aphrodite Hegemone; this statuary type, known in the past as Tiepolo Aphrodite, was particularly popular during the Hellenistic era. According to an inscription, the statue was commissioned by a freedwoman named Anthestia Iucunda in honor of Aphrodite and the Romans who settled in Dion. That took place around the early phases of Isis's temple's construction, however it is not clear whether a cult of Aphrodite Hypolympidia existed before the Imperial period, and the goddess is not known elsewhere in Dion or Macedonia. It is possible that the statue originally stood in another sanctuary in the city, and was transferred during the renovations of Anthestia.

The base of the statue was created much later, dating to the second century AD, so that the statue could be placed at the goddess's shrine during reconstruction works on the temple in the 100s AD. The statue was possibly located in the central spot of her temple.

The first excavations at Dion took place in 1931, and again a second one in 1973 under the supervision of professor Demetrios Pandermanlis, when the statue was discovered; the head and base were found at the temple of Aphrodite Hypolympidia, while the rest of the body was at a canal not far from the temple of Isis.

== Description ==
Aphrodite is wearing a chiton and standing on a rock, next to a tree trunk (the marble sculpture's support), her head slightly inclined downward. Her hair is tied on the top of the head, bound up in an elaborate topknot. She is relaxed as she stands on her left leg, with her right leg relaxed and softly bent. She places her left hand on her waist. She wears a transparent chiton, while the himation wrapped around her torso and wrist falls loosely over the right leg. Even though Aphrodite is dressed, her body and her position shows an unmistaken erotic and sexual mood.

The statue is smaller than lifesize, 113 cm tall and 49 cm wide, made of marble. The right arm, which would have been inserted separately and made from a different piece of marble, is entirely gone and part of the right foot is also missing. The head, originally broken off, had to be reattached.

== See also ==
- Aphrodite of Syracuse
- Aphrodite of Rhodes
- Armed Aphrodite

== Bibliography ==
- Kakoulidou, Eleftheria (February 2019). Female statues and figurines in central Macedonia: An iconographical approach (PDF) (Thesis). Thessaloniki – Greece: International Hellenic University.
- Mazurek, Lindsey A. (February 24, 2022). Isis in a Global Empire: Greek Identity through Egyptian Religion in Roman Greece. Cambridge University Press. ISBN 978-1-316-51701-7.
- Pandermalis, Demetrios (2016). Gods and Mortals at Olympus: Ancient Dion, City of Zeus. Greece: Greek Ministry of Culture and Sports. ISBN 978-0-9906142-2-7.
