= Muristus =

Greek inventor

Muristus, Miristus or Murtus was an inventor to whom two organ-like instruments are attributed. His name is mentioned in medieval Arabic sources and may refer to Ctesibius of Alexandria or another Greek writer.

== See also ==
- Hydraulis
