= Joan Francioni =

American computer scientist

Prof. Joan Francioni
- Website: https://cs.winona.edu/Francioni/background.html

Joan Francioni is an American Professor of Computer Science who works at the Winona State University in Winona, Minnesota. She received the first Ph.D. in Computer Science awarded by Florida State University in 1981. Francioni is noted for working with a number of community projects, including the Sustainable Foods Partnership and her work with visually impaired students.

== Career ==
Francioni's dissertation was Decomposition of Fuzzy Switching Functions at Florida State University 1981. Francioni started at her career at Litton Data Systems, where she worked for two years before working at a number of educational institutions, including Florida State University, Michigan Technological University and the University of Louisiana in Lafayette. Francioni then gained experience working for one year as a visiting scientist at the North Carolina Supercomputing Center. Francioni joined Winona State University in 1998 as a Full Professor.

In her early career, Francioni researched and made contributions in parallel computing and parallel debugging. Later in her career her research focused on computer science education, specialising in visually impaired students.

Francioni has collaborated on 35 scientific publications and served on numerous program committees, including being a department chair for 10 years. She is a member of the Advisory Committee for the Women's and Gender Studies Program at Winona State University and is the Faculty Liaison for the Center for Engaged Teaching and Scholarship.
