= Francini =

Francini is a surname. Notable people with the surname include:

- Enrique Mario Francini (1916–1978), Argentine tango violinist
- Giovanni Francini (born 1963), retired Italian footballer
- Loris Francini (born 1962), San Marinese politician
- Sebastián Francini (born 1989), Argentine actor
- Tommaso Francini (1571–1651), Florentine hydraulics engineer and garden designer

== See also ==
- 42929 Francini, main belt asteroid with an orbital period of 3.7 years
