= Dimitrios Pandermalis =

Greek archaeologist (1940–2022)

- Born: 1940; Thessaloniki, Greece
- Died: 14 September 2022 (aged 81–82); Athens, Attica, Greece

Dimitrios Pandermalis (Greek: Δημήτριος Παντερμαλής; 1940 – 14 September 2022) was a Greek archaeologist. He was professor of archaeology at the Aristotle University of Thessaloniki, supervisor of the Archaeological site of Dion, Pieria and curator of the new Acropolis Museum.

His death was announced on 14 September 2022, at the age of 82.
