= Dion =

Dion may refer to:

== People ==
=== Ancient ===
- Dion (mythology), a king in Laconia and husband of Iphitea, the daughter of Prognaus
- Dion of Syracuse (408–354 BC), ancient Greek politician
- Dio of Alexandria, first century BC, ancient Greek philosopher
- Dion of Naples, an ancient Greek mathematician cited by Augustine of Hippo along with Adrastus of Cyzicus
- Dio Chrysostom, also known as Dion Chrysostomos (c. 40 – c. 115), a Greek orator, writer, philosopher and historian
- Cassius Dio, also known as Dion Kassios (c. AD 155 – 235), a Roman consul

=== Modern ===
==== Given name ====
- Dion Acoff (born 1991), American soccer player
- Dion Aiye (born 1987), Papua New Guinean rugby league footballer
- Dion Bailey (born 1992), American football player
- Dion Basco (born 1977), American actor
- Dion Bates (born 1981), New Zealand rugby union player
- Dion Beasley, Australian artist
- Dion Beebe (born 1968), Australian-South African cinematographer
- Dion Drena Beljo (born 2002), Croatian footballer
- Dion Bennett (born 1974), New Zealand cricketer
- Dion Bentley (born 1971), American long jumper
- Dion Berisha (born 2003), Kosovan footballer
- Dion Beukeboom (born 1989), Dutch cyclist
- Dion Bird (born 1976), Australian rugby league footballer
- Dion Boucicault (1820–1890), Irish actor and dramatist
- Dion Boucicault Jr. (1859–1929), American actor
- Dion Brandon (born 1986), Caymanian footballer
- Dion Byrum (born 1983), American football player
- Dion Charles (born 1995), English-Northern Irish footballer
- Dion Chen, Hong Kong educator
- Dion Carlos Choi (born 1999), Macanese footballer
- Dion Ciccarelli (born 1967), American racing driver
- Dion Conroy (born 1995), English footballer
- Dion Cools (born 1996), Malaysian footballer
- Dion Cooper (born 1993), Dutch singer and songwriter
- Dion Cope, Australian rugby league player
- Dion Crabbe (born 1977), British Virgin Islands sprinter
- Dion Dawkins (born 1994), American football player
- Dion De Neve (born 2001), Belgian footballer
- Dion Diamond (born 1941), American civil rights activist
- Dion DiMucci (born 1939), American singer/songwriter known professionally as "Dion"
- Dion Dixon (born 1989), American basketball player
- Dion Donohue (born 1993), Welsh footballer
- Dion Dowell (born 1985), American professional basketball player
- Dion Dreesens (born 1993), Dutch swimmer
- Dion Dublin (born 1969), English footballer and television presenter
- Dion Ebrahim (born 1980), Zimbabwean cricketer
- Dion English, U. S. Navy admiral
- Dion Esajas (born 1980), Dutch footballer
- Dion Ferrier (born 1980), Guyanese cricketer
- Dion Forster (born 1972), South African clergyman
- Dion Fortune (1890–1946), British occultist
- Dion Foxx (born 1971), American football player
- Dion Gales (born 1985), American football player
- Dion Gallapeni (born 2004), Kosovan footballer
- Dion George (born 1966), South African politician
- Dion Glass (1934–2011), Northern Irish rugby union player
- Dion Glover (born 1978), American basketball player
- Dion Gosling (born 1971), New Zealand field hockey player
- Dion Gowda (born 2007), Indian racing driver
- Dion Graham, American actor and narrator
- Dion Graus (born 1967), Dutch politician
- Dion Harris (born 1985), American basketball player
- Dion-Curtis Henry (born 1997), English footballer
- Dion Huidekooper (born 1993), Dutch politician
- Dion Ignacio (born 1986), Filipino actor
- Dion James (born 1962), American baseball player
- Dion Jenkins (born 1979), American singer, songwriter, and producer known by the mononym "Dion"
- Dion Jordan (born 1990), American football player
- Dion Kacuri (born 2004), Swiss footballer
- Dion Kelly-Evans (born 1996), English footballer
- Dion Kitson, English artist
- Dion Knelsen (born 1989), Canadian ice hockey player
- Dion Krasniqi (born 2003), Swedish footballer
- Dion Lam (born 1961), Hong Kong actor
- Dion Lambert (born 1969), American football player
- Dion Lee (born 1985), Australian fashion designer
- Dion Lennox (born 1998), American professional wrestler
- Dion Leonard, Australian/British ultramarathon runner
- Dion Lewis (born 1990), American football player
- Dion Lim (c. 2010s), American news anchor and reporter
- Dion Lobb (born 1980), New Zealand cricketer
- Dion Lopy (born 2002), Senegalese footballer
- Dion Lunadon (born 1976), New Zealand musician
- Dion Malone (born 1989), Surinamese footballer
- Dion Markx (born 2005), Indonesian footballer
- Dion Martinez (1837–1928), Cuban-born American chess player
- Dion Miles (born 1978), Australian rules footballer
- Dion von Moltke (born 1990), American-born race car driver
- Dion Morton, British surgeon
- Dion Myers (born 2002), Zimbabwean cricketer
- Dion Nash (born 1971), New Zealand cricketer
- Dion Nelin (born 1976), Danish carom billiards player
- Dion Neutra (1926–2019), American architect
- Dion Nukunuku (born 1970), New Zealand softball player
- Dion O'Cuinneagain (born 1972), South African-Irish rugby union footballer
- Dion O'Neale, New Zealand applied mathematician
- Dion Ørnvold (1921–2006), Danish footballer
- Dion Parson (born 1967), American jazz drummer
- Dion Payton (1950–2021), American guitarist and singer
- Dion Pellerin (born 1998), Canadian professional footballer
- Dion Pereira (born 1999), Antiguan footballer
- Dion Phaneuf (born 1985), Canadian ice hockey player
- Dion Prestia (born 1992), Australian rules footballer
- Dion Prewster (born 1990), American-New Zealand basketball player
- Dion Rankine (born 2002), English footballer
- Dion Ruffo Luci (born 2001), Italian footballer
- Dion Russell (born 1975), Australian racewalker
- Dion Sanderson (born 1999), English footballer
- Dion Scott (born 1970), Australian rules footballer
- Dion Scott (English footballer) (born 1980)
- Dion Sembie-Ferris (born 1996), English footballer
- Dion Sims (born 1991), American football player
- Dion Smith (born 1993), New Zealand bicycle racer
- Dion Stovell (born 1984), Bermudian cricketer
- Dion Taljard (born 1970), South African cricketer
- Dion Taufitu, Niuean politician
- Dion Teaupa (born 2002), Tongan rugby union footballer
- Dion Titheradge (1889–1934), Australian actor and playwright
- Dion Valle (born 1977), Chilean-Australian footballer
- Dion Vlak (born 2001), Dutch footballer
- Dion Waiters (born 1991), American basketball player
- Dion Waller (born 1974), New Zealand rugby union footballer
- Dion Weisler (born 1967), CEO of HP Inc.
- Dion Williams (1869–1952), United States Marine Corps
- Dion Wiyoko (born 1984), Indonesian actor
- Dion Woods (born 1982), Australian rules footballer
- Dion Workman, New Zealand singer
- Dion Yatras (born 1968), Zimbabwean cricketer

==== Surname ====
- Celine Dion (born 1968), Canadian singer
- Colleen Dion (born 1964), American actress
- Jeannine Dion-Guérin (1933–2025), French writer and poet
- Josh Dion Band, American music group led by singer/drummer Josh Dion
- Leopold Dion (1920–1972), Canadian serial killer and rapist
- Olivier Dion (born 1991), Canadian pop singer
- Pascal Dion (born 1994), Canadian short track speed skater
- Stéphane Dion (born 1955), Canadian academic and politician

== Places ==
- Dion, Archaeological Park, the ancient site of the religious center of Macedonia
- Dion, Archaeological Museum, the finds of the ancient site are exhibited here
- Dion, Pieria, the great "sacred place" of the Ancient Macedonians, ancient city and archaeological site, and a modern town
- Dion (Chalcidice), a town of ancient Chalcidice
- Dion (Coele-Syria), a town of ancient Coele-Syria, in the Decapolis of the Roman Empire
- Dion (Crete), a town of ancient Crete
- Dion (Euboea), a town of ancient Euboea
- Dium (Pisidia) or Dion, a town of ancient Pisidia
- Dion (Thessaly), a town of ancient Thessaly
- Dion, part of the municipality of Beauraing, province of Namur, Belgium
- Dion Islands, Antarctica

== Other uses ==
- Dion (geometry), one-dimension polytope
- Dion (skipper), a genus of butterflies in the grass skippers family
- Mitsubishi Dion, a compact MPV produced by Mitsubishi Motors
- Dion (Transformers), a character from the Transformers franchise
- Dion Lesage, a character from the 2023 game Final Fantasy XVI
- Dion Blaster, a character in 1080° Snowboarding
- Dion (album), a 1968 album by Dion DiMucci

== See also ==
- Deioneus: Deon, Deion, Deone, Dion, Dione, Dionne
- Dio (disambiguation)
