= Dium (disambiguation) =

Dium is a Latinisation of Greek Dion, and may refer to:

- Dion, Pieria, in modern Greece
- Dium (Chalcidice), a city of ancient Chalcidice, now on Mount Athos
- Dium (Coele-Syria), a city of ancient Coele-Syria, now in Jordan or Syria
- Dium (Crete), a city of ancient Crete, Greece
- Dium (Euboea), a town of ancient Euboea, Greece
- Dium (Pisidia), a town of ancient Pisidia, now in Turkey
- Dium (Thessaly), a town of ancient Thessaly, Greece
