= Pegasus Theatre =

Theatre in Greece

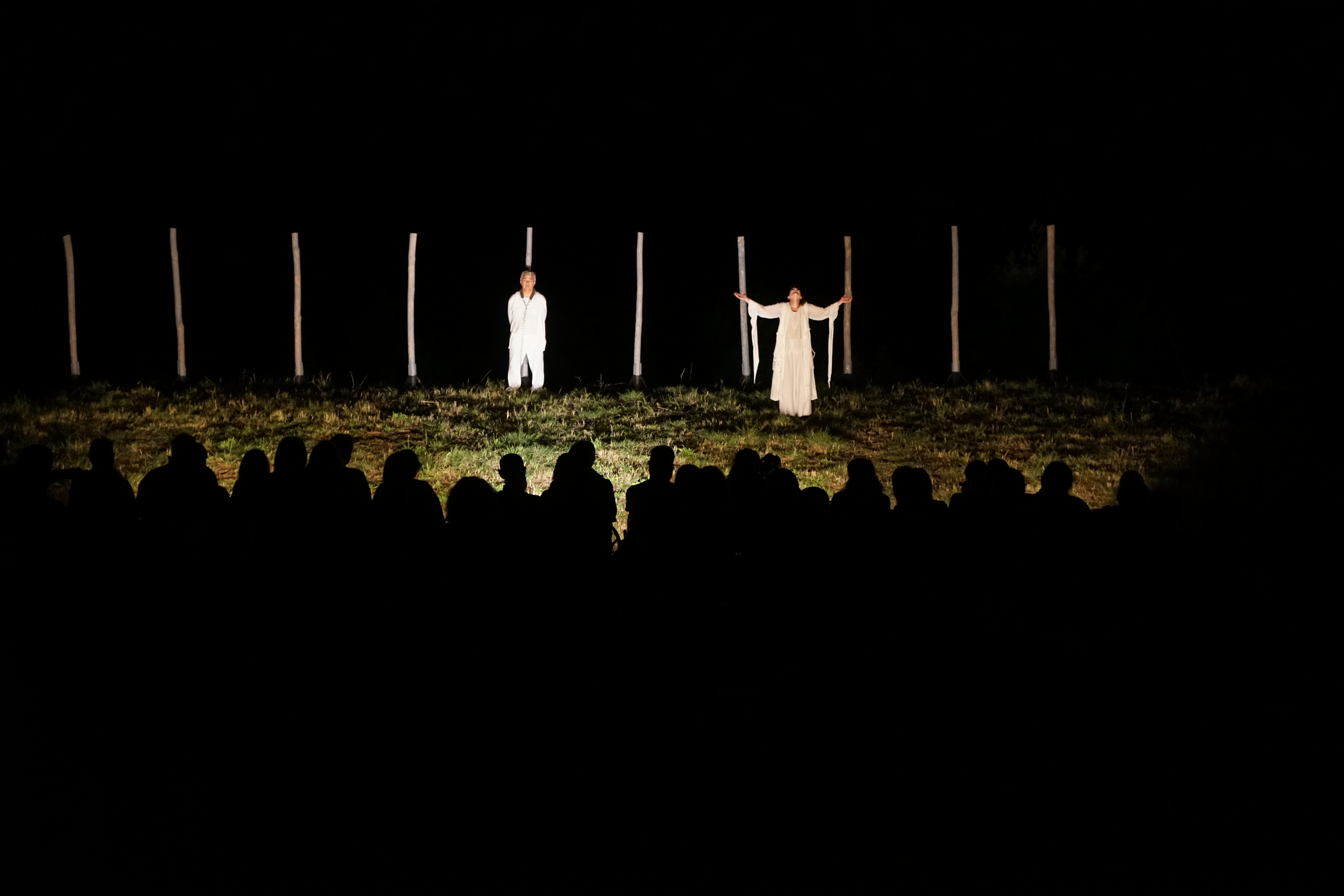
The Face of Medusa, performance at Leibethra Park 2020

The Pegasus Theatre (Greek: Θέατρο Πήγασος) is an association of professional and amateur actors. The repertoire is extensive and ranges from plays for children to the interpretation of classical Greek tragedies. The theatre is located in Agias Ekaterinis district, Katerini, Greece.

== History ==
Pegasus Theatre was officially founded in 1982 by students of the Drama School of the National Theatre of Northern Greece. As early as 1980, the first members of the theater started preparatory activities, so that in 2020 the 40th anniversary was celebrated. In the meantime many plays, written by domestic and foreign authors, have been performed. For example:

- Anton Tschechow
- Franz Kafka
- Dario Fo
- Aristophanes
- Sophokles
- Euripides

== Education ==
In addition to the operation of the theatre and the necessary rehearsals, emphasis is placed on the training of the next generation of actors. Divided by age, three groups were formed:

- Children (6 to 12 years)
- Teenagers (13 to 18 years)
- Adults

The children are introduced to the subject with games. Later they learn to use gestures and facial expressions and to improvise. For the teenagers, expression is honed, they are introduced to the art of acting and the history of theatre.

== Performances ==
The theatre group performs mainly in northern Greece, but has also had several performances in other parts of Greece. The adults perform usually two new plays annually. Pegasus Theatre takes place regularly as part of the Olympus Festival.
