= Dionysus mosaic, Dion =

Preserved mosaic found in Dion, Pieria, Greece

Coordinates: 40.170297°N 22.486414°E

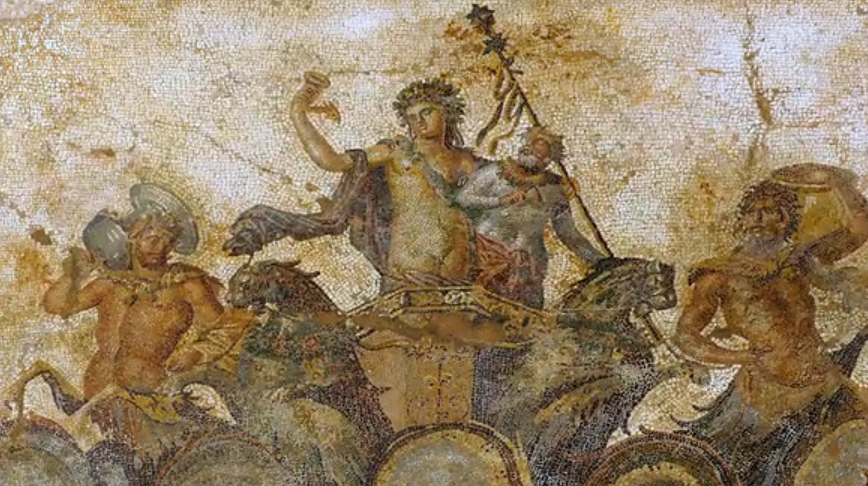
Part of the Dionysus mosaic

The Dionysus mosaic is the largest preserved mosaic found in excavations in Dion. It shows the epiphany of the triumphant Dionysus.

== Location ==
The ancient site, with significant excavations and an archaeological museum, is located just outside the modern village of Dion in the Greek region of Central Macedonia in the coastal plain at the foot of Mount Olympus, about 15 km from Katerini and about 17 km from the ancient city of Leivithra.

== Description ==
In the center of the large mosaic, Dionysus is depicted in a chariot. Next to him stands a mature Silenus, who is more a helper of the god than a driver. The carriage is drawn by two panthers, two centaurs hold their reins. One of the two centaurs is a mature, bearded man carrying a vessel (crater) that probably contains wine. The other Kentauer carries on his shoulder a closed vessel in which presumably the sacred symbols of the Dionysus cult are located. The light background highlights the figure of Dionysus.

The mosaic artist used mosaic stones (tesserae) of different sizes and several dozens of shades of color to show details. He thereby gave his work the character of a painting. Surely he was inspired to his work by an important Hellenistic painting.

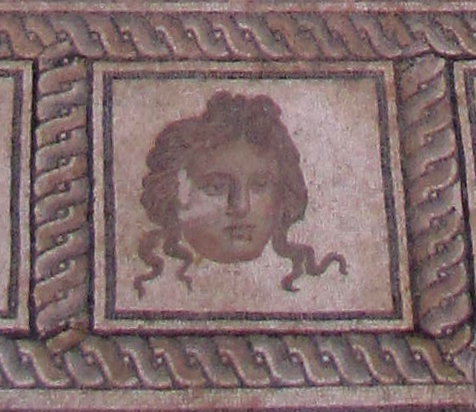
Dionysus mask

Of high quality are also the masks under and above the central mosaic. Three on the eastern and three on the western side.

The middle of the three masks of the lower (eastern) side shows Dionysus with long curls. The mask to his left shows a mature satyr with a snub nose.

The mask to the right of him shows a barbarian. The eyes sting, his eyes are lowered. Probably it is Lycurgus, King of Thrace, and an enemy of Dionysus. He pursued the young god, who threw himself into the sea and was saved by Thetis.

The masks above (west) of the Dionysosmosa form a young Satyr on the left and an older Silenius on the right. The mask in between shows the face of a woman with blue eyes and curly hair. This may be the nymph Thetis, the savior of Dionysus.

The central mosaic of the epiphany of Dionysus has the dimensions of 220 cm by 150 cm; The entire mosaic has a floor area of approximately 100 m^{2}.

== Excavations ==
In the summer of 1987 archaeologists found the most important mosaic of the extensive excavation site (As of February 2018, excavations are still under way). Protected by the covering soil layer it is almost completely preserved.

Of course this precious find had to be protected but should also be accessible to the public. The archaeologists decided to name the place where the mosaic was unearthed "Villa of Dionysus". For over 20 years, the mosaic was sheltered under a roof structure. In order to be able to see the work from all sides, a footbridge was built, on which visitors could orbit it. The roof helped against the rays of the sun, but it was powerless against water and general decay. From year to year the condition became worse: single mosaic stones dissolved from the ground, plants grew in the cracks, it was only a matter of time before this mosaic, which had remained largely intact for nearly two millennia, would be destroyed.

== Restoration ==
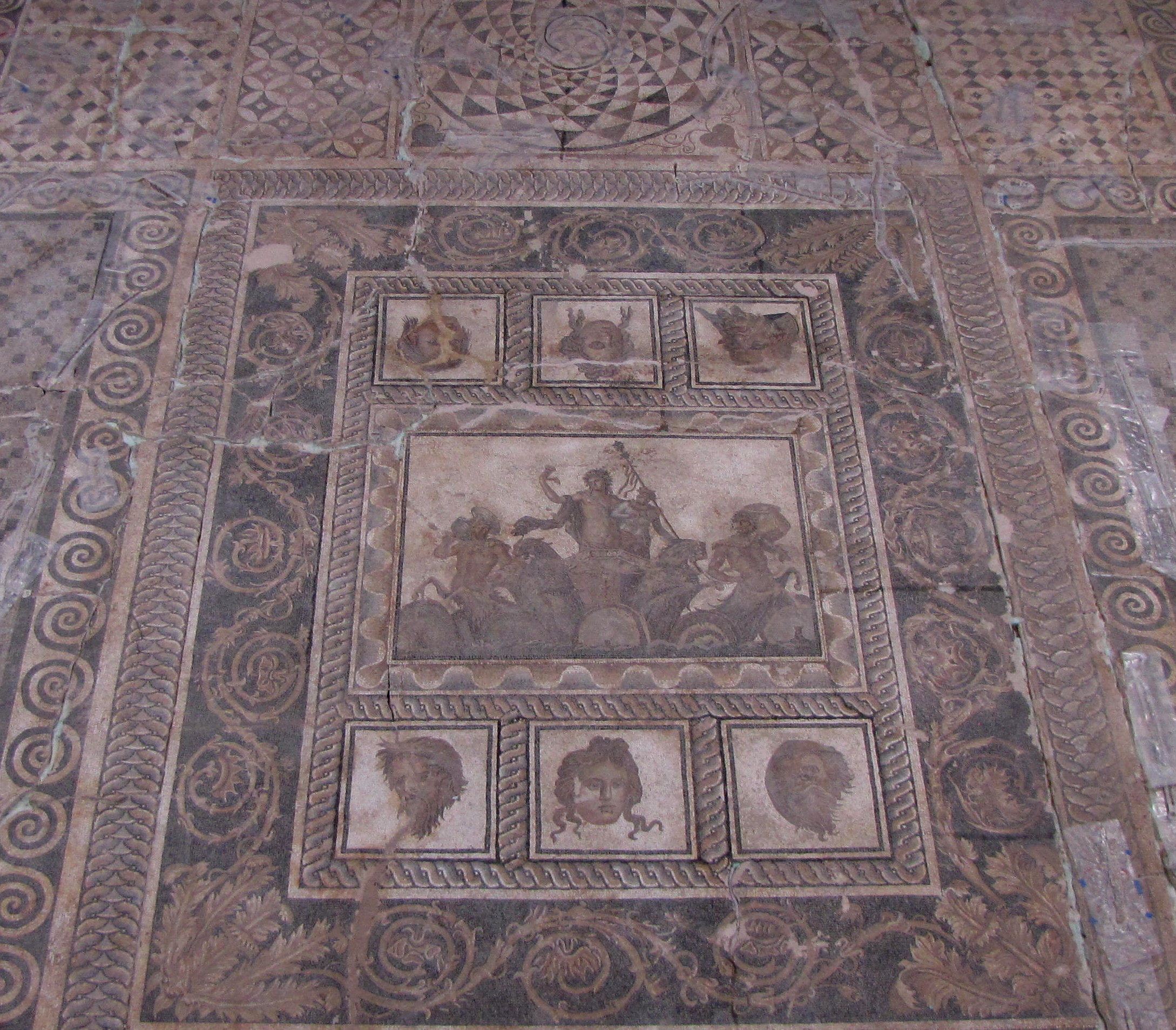
Works at the mosaic

It was decided to create a special building for this work of art. It is located just west of the museum, the Archaiothiki. After completion of the building the mosaic had to be removed from the "Villa of Dionysos". In the fall of 2015, conservators, archaeologists and workers began this project. In order to be able to divide the mosaic into several parts, the position and shape of the individual mosaic stones were first recorded on the intended dividing lines. They were then removed. A special adhesive fabric and textile strips were applied to fix the remaining stones in their place. The mosaic was divided into several, transportable, plates. After that, these plates had to be separated from the underlying ground. At the edge, with long drills, close to each other, holes were drilled into the ground beneath the fixed object. With flat steel blades, which were cut into the holes at certain intervals, experts separated the mosaic from the ground. Then it was carefully raised to allow a suitable steel plate to be driven underneath. The helpers covered the surface with a wooden plate. With several belt tensioners, the plates (steel plate and wooden plate) were fixed against each other so that no movement was possible during transportation. Via a ramp the parts, weighing up to 500 kg, reached a trailer and were transported to the Archaiothiki.

Meanwhile, in the Archaiothiki, a precise image of the entire mosaic was spread on the ground. It was made on a scale of 1:1 to show the restorers where to place each single part. In order to stabilize the mosaic stones, in the next step, the carrier layer under the mosaic was removed and replaced by mortar. With steam, the curators dissolved the special adhesive fabric and removed the attached protective materials. In June 2017 the works had been finished.
