= Korakias =

Headland in northern Crete

Coordinates: 35°25′11″N 24°45′45″E

Korakias or Cape Korakias (Greek: Άκρα Κορακιάς, romanized: Akra Korakias) is a headland in northern Crete; the northwest extremity of the bay of Bali. It is identified with the ancient promontory called Dium or Dion (Ancient Greek: Δίον ἄκρον, romanized: Dion akron, Latin: Dium promontorium). It has been supposed by some authors that the ancient city of Dium, spoken of by Pliny the Elder, was located near this headland.
