= Olympus Festival =

Annual music and theatre festival in Greece

Coordinates: 40.269873°N 22.509787°E

Olympus Festival (Greek: Φεστιβάλ Ολύμπου) is an annual festival of music and theatre and a major cultural event in Greece. It is the largest event of its kind in northern Greece and takes place annually in the months of July and August. The aim is to provide both, the local population and tourists, with cultural entertainment and thus to promote the contact between different cultures and the tourism of the region. The festival is supported by the Greek Ministry of Culture and the former municipality of Dion, as well as by other local authorities in Pieria.

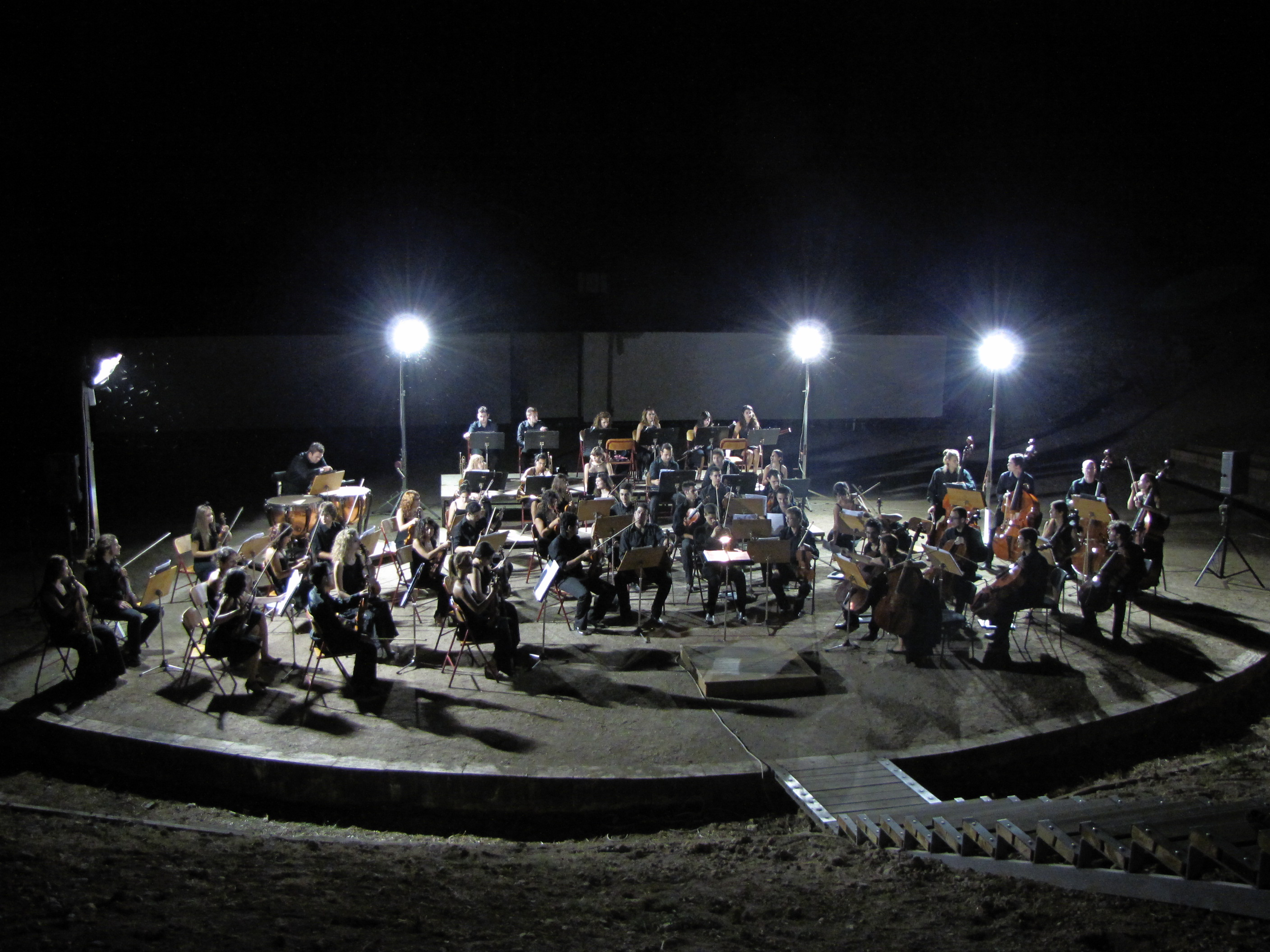
Classical concert at Dion

== Organisation ==
The Festival is organized by Festival Olympou (OR.FE.O), (Οργανισμό Φεστιβάλ Ολύμπου (OΡ.ΦΕ.O)), based in Katerini. It is a non-profit organization dedicated to the promotion of Greek and international culture, as well as the promotion of tourism in Northern Greece. It is represented by a nine member Management Board, elections are held every three years.

OR.FE.O cooperates with the state theaters in Athens and Thessaloniki. Furthermore, contacts to private theaters and artist organizations are cultivated. It is also important to develop and maintain the network of foreign artists and cultural organizations abroad. This way combinations come to be, such as the performance of the Swan Lake ballet at the 2016 Festival, where professional dancers from Russia performed together with the pupils of local ballet schools.

The funding of the festival is mainly supported by donations, and the sale of the tickets. In the years 2011–2013 the financing of the event was ensured by the European Union. Occasionally, the Greek state helps with the financing of the festival operation.

Many Greek singers, actors and actresses took part at the Olympus Festival during its 45 years (as of 2017) of operation. Famous Greek artists like Maria Farantouri, Mario Frangoulis, George Dalaras, Nana Mouskouri, Haris Alexiou, Anna Synodinou, Antigone Valakou, Thimios Karakatsanis, Dimitris Mitropanos and many others have appeared at the Olympus Festival.

== History ==
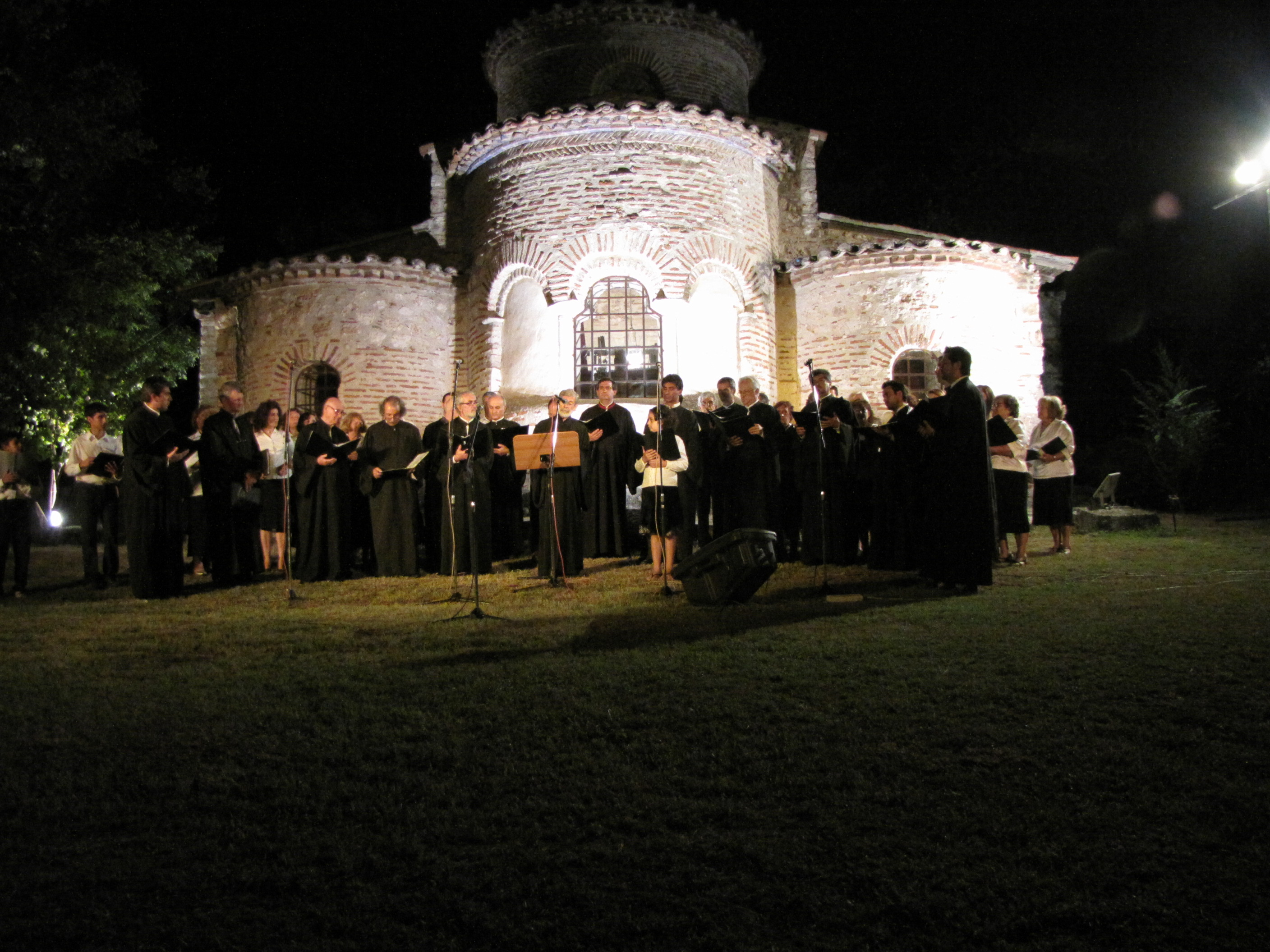
Choir at Kontariotissa

The first Olympos Festival took place in 1972. Since 2010, the Olympus Festival has been cooperating with a guest country of honor. The aim is to deepen the friendship between Greece and the guest country and to present its cultural peculiarities. Some of the festival's events are reserved for artists of this country. The film is increasingly used as a medium to bring the public closer to the culture of the honored country.

The Countries of honor since 2010:

- 2010 France
- 2011 Spain
- 2012 Russia
- 2013 Norway
- 2014 Austria, Germany and Switzerland
- 2015 Morocco
- 2016 Romania
- 2017 Cyprus
- 2018 Czech Republic
- 2019 Israel
- 2020 No country of honor, canceled from 14 August (Coronavirus disease)
- 2021 No country of honor (Coronavirus disease)
- 2022 No country of honor (Coronavirus disease)
- 2023 India

== Program ==
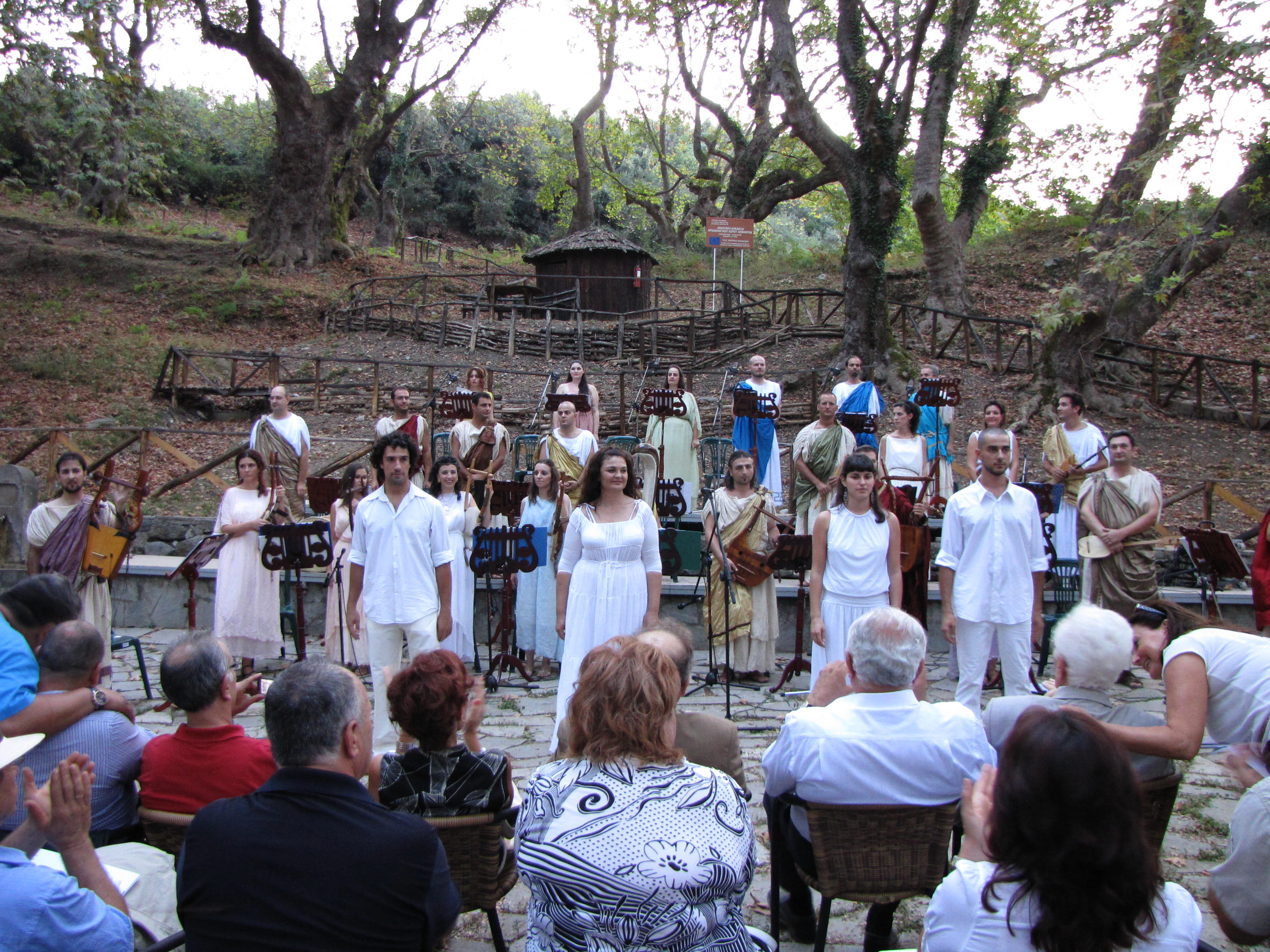
Performance at the Acropolis of Ancient Leivithra

The program includes:

- Ballet
- Classical concerts
- Classical comedies and tragedies from Hellenistic times
- Theatre
- Choirs
- Traditional Greek music.
- Performances of modern music.
- Free guided tours of the archaeological parks of Dion and Leivithra.
- Archaeological information events, with specific focus topics or the reference to new finds in the excavation sites.

As indicated by the data the education of audience was above average, that mainly women attend the events, and the regular access area from which visitors came from Thessaloniki, Larissa to Kozani.

== Venues ==
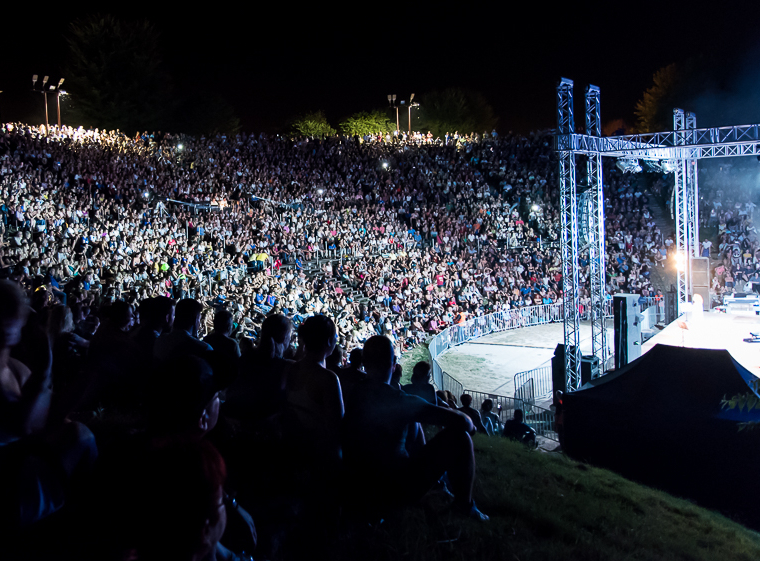
Concert at Dion

- Dion, Greek theater. It dates back to the Hellenistic era. Here, about 2400 years ago, the Bakchen of Euripides were premiered.
- Leivithra, archaeological park. The singer and poet Orpheus was said to have lived here.
- Pydna, Excavation Site. Here, 168 BC., the Macedonian king Perseus lost the decisive battle against the Roman invaders.
- Castle of Platamonas. A building from Byzantine times, erected on the hill on which also the position of the ancient city Herakleion is suspected.
- Byzantine Church of the Holy Mother, Kontariotissa. The church was built on existing, much older, foundations about 1000 years ago.

Other venues are: The amphitheater in the Litochoro Park, the Olympus National Park Information Center in Litochoro and the Center of Mosaic Art in Dion.

== Sources ==
- "Identity of the Olympus Festival – Organization Festival Olympou (OR.FE.O), Katerini, Greece" (PDF). Organization Festival Olympou (OR.FE.O) – via Dropbox.
