= Dion Taljard =

South African cricketer (born 1970)

Personal information
- Born: 7 January 1970 (age 56); East London, South Africa
- Source: Cricinfo, 15 September 2017

Dion Taljard (born 7 January 1970) is a South African former cricketer. He played twenty-five first-class cricket matches for Border between 1993 and 2000. In September 2017, he was sentenced to 18 years in jail, after being convicted on 19 counts of rape, two of indecent assault and one of witness intimidation.
