= Dion Carlos Choi =

Macanese footballer

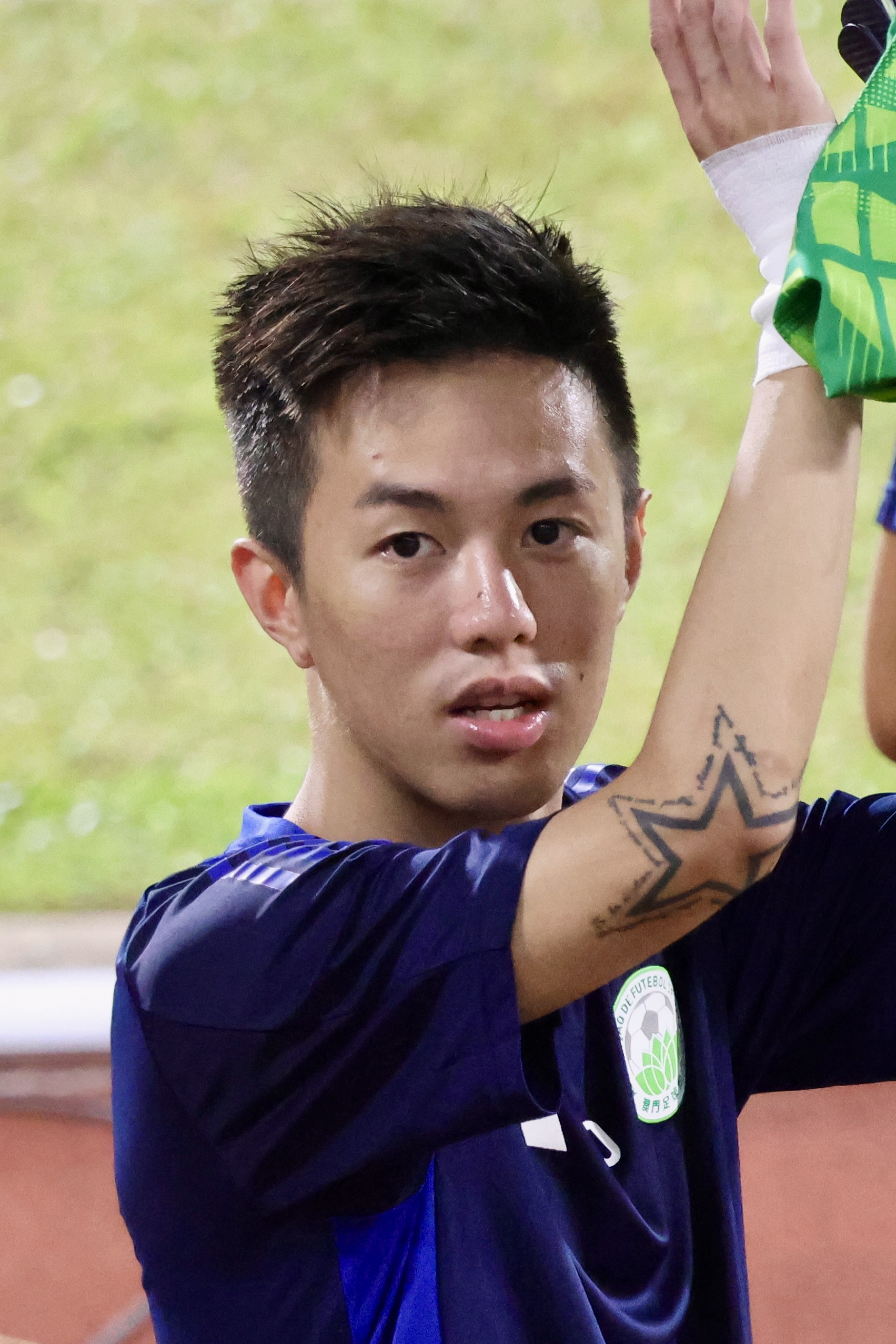
- Dion with Macau in 2024

Personal information
- Date of birth: 6 February 1999 (age 27)
- Place of birth: Portuguese Macau
- Position: Midfielder

Team information
- Current team: Benfica (Macau)
- Number: 10

Youth career
- 2013–2015: MFA Development

Senior career*
Years	Team	Apps	(Gls)
2015–2017	MFA Development	14	(2)
2018	Monte Carlo	13	(0)
2019–	Benfica de Macau	47	(15)
- Chao Pak Kei

International career^{‡}
2012–2013	Macau U14	3	(0)
2014–2015	Macau U16	4	(0)
2016–2018	Macau U19	5	(0)
2017	Macau U23	4	(0)
2018-	Macau	5	(0)
- * Club domestic league appearances and goals as of 19:12, 13 March 2022 (UTC) ‡ National team caps and goals as of 19:12, 30 June 2023 (UTC)

Dion Carlos Choi (Chinese: 徐崚峰; born 6 February 1999) is a Macanese footballer who currently plays as a midfielder for Chao Pak Kei and the Macau national football team.

== Career statistics ==
=== Club ===
As of 13 March 2021.

Club	Season	League			Cup		Continental		Other		Total	
Club	Season	Division	Apps	Goals	Apps	Goals	Apps	Goals	Apps	Goals	Apps	Goals
MFA Development	2017	Liga de Elite	13	2	0	0	–		0	0	13	2
Monte Carlo	2019	Liga de Elite	13	0	0	0	–		0	0	13	0
Benfica (Macau)	2020	Liga de Elite	8	3	0	0	–		0	0	8	3
Benfica (Macau)	2021	Liga de Elite	1	0	0	0	–		0	0	1	0
Benfica (Macau)	Total		9	3	0	0	0	0	0	0	9	3
Career total			35	5	0	0	0	0	0	0	35	5

=== International ===
As of 30 March 2025

National team	Year	Apps	Goals
Macau	2023	3	0
Macau	2024	1	0
Macau	2025	1	0
Total		5	0
