= Dion Lobb =

New Zealand cricketer (born 1980)

Personal information
- Full name: Dion Victor Lobb
- Born: 3 December 1980 (age 45); Dunedin, Otago, New Zealand
- Batting: Right-handed
- Bowling: Right-arm medium

Domestic team information
- Years: Team
- 2006/07: Otago
- Only FC: 12 March 2007 Otago v Auckland
- Source: ESPNcricinfo, 15 May 2016

Dion Victor Lobb (born 3 December 1980) is a New Zealand former cricketer who played one first-class match for Otago during the 2006–07 season.

Lobb was born at Dunedin in 1980 and played club cricket for Green Island CC in the city. His only senior representative match came in Otago's final Plunket Shield match of the 2006–07 season, a match against Auckland at the University of Otago Oval in Dunedin. He took a single wicket and scored four runs during the match. The following season he played a match for a New Zealand XI against the touring England side ahead of the Test match series.

Lobb retired from cricket at the end of the 2018–19 season, becoming a coach. He had played a record 415 matches for Green Island.
