= Archaeological Park of Dion =

Archaeological site in Pieria, Greece

Dion
- Δίον (Greek)
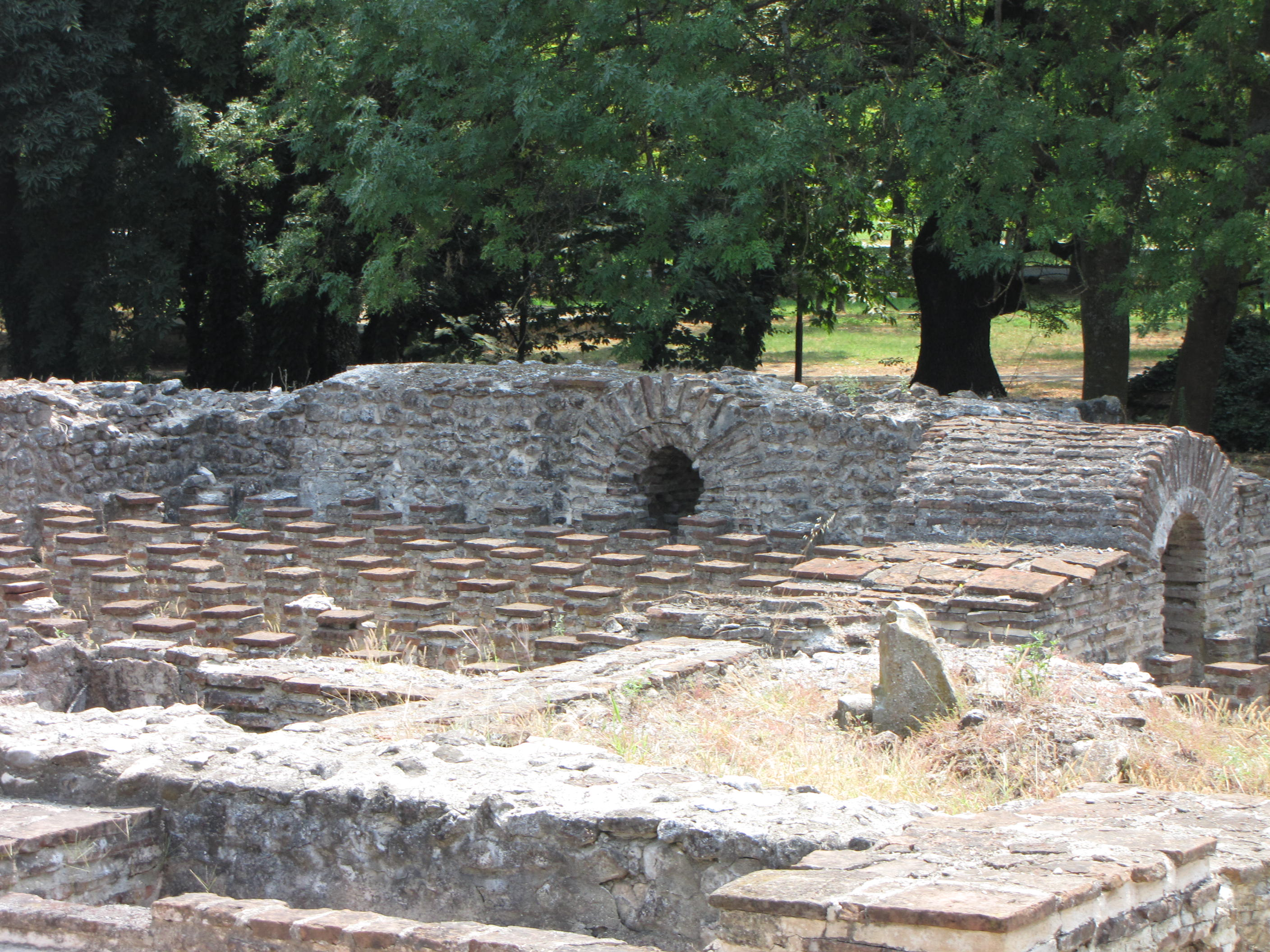
- The Thermal Baths

- Location within Greece
- 40°10′33″N 22°29′29″E
- Type: Settlement
- Cultures: Ancient Greece
- Location: Macedonia, Greece

Site notes
- Website: ancientdion.org

The Archaeological Park of Dion is the most important archaeological site at Mount Olympus in Greece, located in Dion (Greek: Δίον). In the area comprised by the Archaeological Park of Dion, sanctuaries were found from the Hellenistic and Roman periods. The park displays the importance of ancient Dion in the history of Pieria.

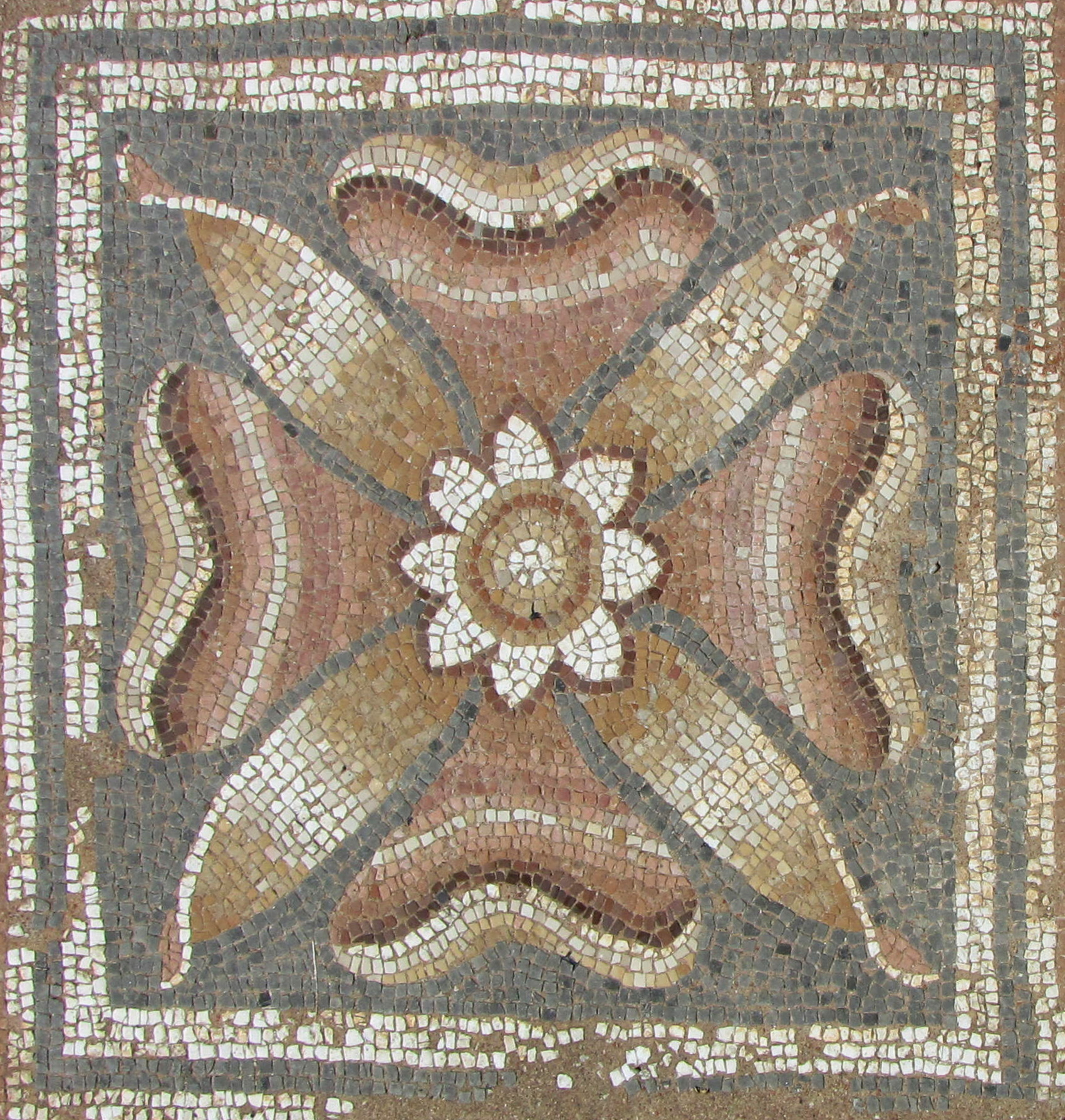
Mosaic at the thermal baths

== Location ==
Dion is located at the north-east foot of Mount Olympus. It is five kilometers from the sea, 15 kilometers from Katerini and 17 kilometers from the ancient Leivithra. In Hellenistic times the distance to the sea was only 1.5 kilometers. Dion is connected with the Thermaean Gulf by the once navigable river Baphyras.

== Archaeological facilities ==
=== The archaeological Park ===
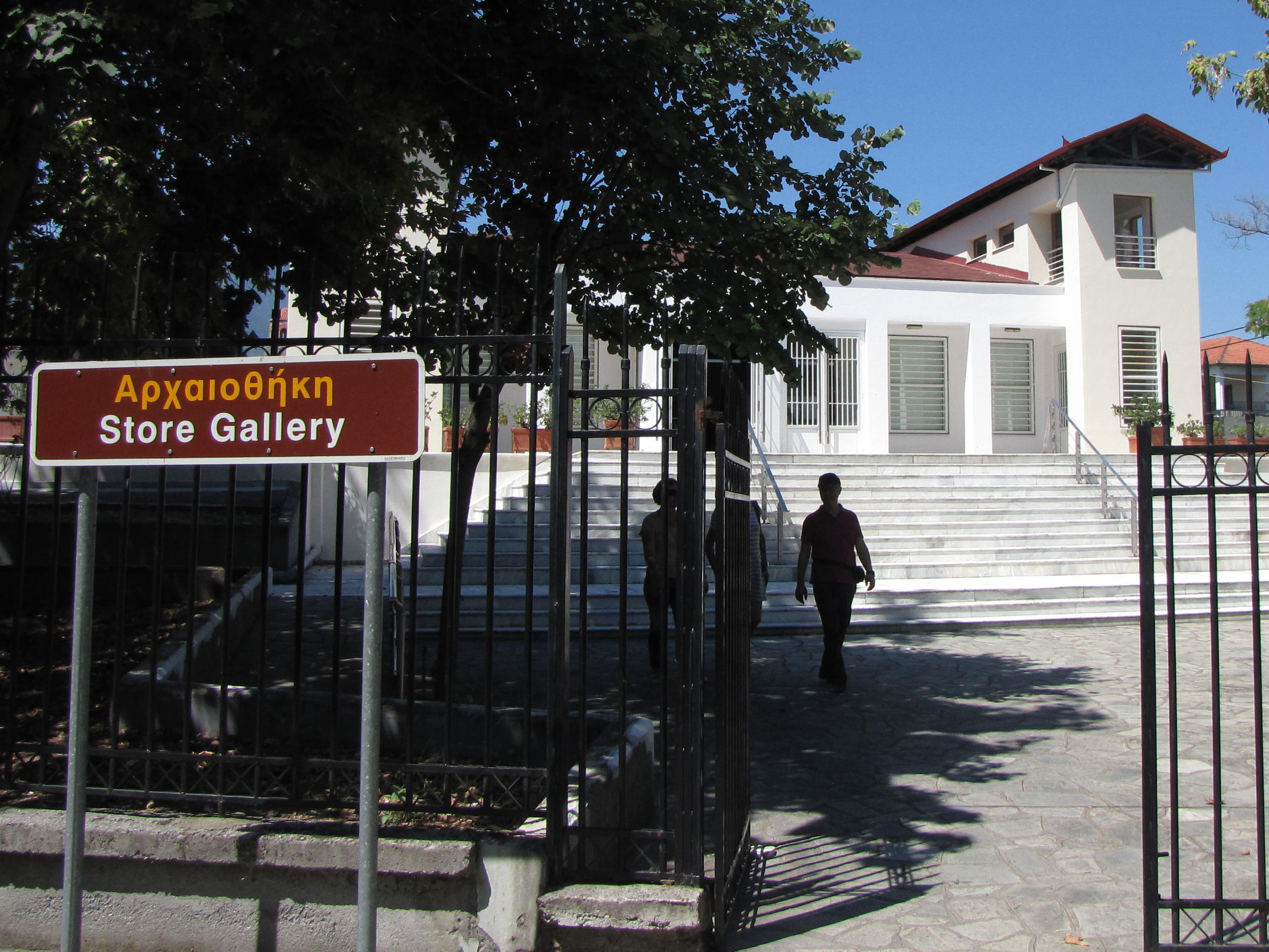
The Archaeotheke

The park has an area of 150 hectares, of which nearly 50 hectares belong to the urban area and 50 hectares to the sanctuaries. The other area has not yet been explored archaeologically. In the former urban area residential buildings, a market square, public buildings, churches, bathhouses, shops, workshops and toilets have been found. The sanctuaries, the theaters and the cemetery are located outside the city

=== The archaeological museum ===
Half a kilometer west of the archaeological park, in the modern village of Dion, is the archaeological museum, built in 1983. Here the finds of ancient Dion and other archaeological places are exhibited. On the first floor there are also exhibits from Pydna and other archaeological sites of Pieria. In a small cinema, visitors will be audiovisual informed about Dion.

=== The archaeotheke ===
The building was erected directly behind the museum on the western side, specifically for the exhibition of the Dionysos mosaic. On the upper floor, a gallery is arranged around the mosaic so that the visitor can view it from all perspectives. In showcases recently found exhibits are displayed.

== History ==
424 v. Thucydides mentions Dion as the first city reached by the Spartan general Brasidas, coming from Thessaly (Tempi) in Macedonia. Pausanias mentioned Dion as one of the places where Orpheus had lived.

In the Hellenistic period, Dion became the religious center of Macedonia. Zeus was venerated here, and Olympic games were held in honor of Zeus and the Muses. The village of Dion gained a certain importance within Greece through the sanctuary and over time developed into a city. Alexander the Great sacrificed to Zeus in Dion before he began his campaign against the Persians. Later, he had 25 bronze statues of the cavaliers fallen in the Battle of the Cranicos, erected in the Zeus Olympios Shrine. In the year 219 BC, the city was destroyed by the Aitolians. Philipp V had the city rebuilt immediately. The Romans took the city 169 BC. Gradually, Roman settlers came to Dion and brought their officialdom, their units of measurement and weight units with them. In the course of the changing owners, more sanctuaries were built. After the middle of the 3rd century AD, the decline started by the raids of neighboring tribes, earthquakes and floods. In the fourth century AD, Dion (Dium) experienced a last flourishing when it became the official seat of a bishop. The place is last mentioned as an administrative district of the Byzantine emperor Constantinos Porphyrogennetos in the 10th century.

=== Recent history ===
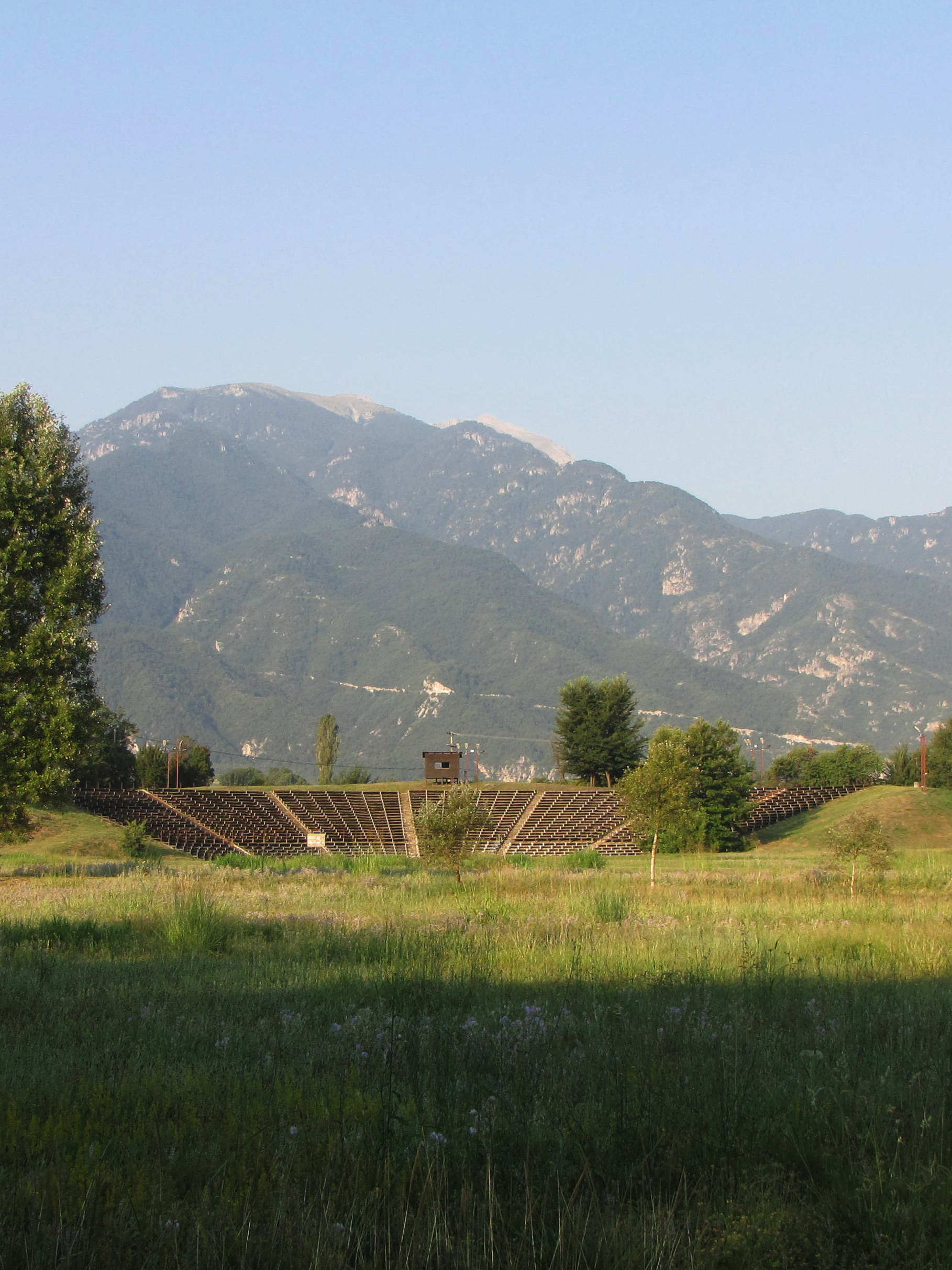
The Hellenistic theatre

At the end of the 18th century, the French consul Felix de Beaujour visited ancient Dion without knowing the ancient site that was abandoned and covered with the remains of buildings and columns.

In December 1806 the ancient Dion was rediscovered by the English explorer William M. Leake. He identified the ruins of ancient Dion near the village of Melathria, a small village inhabited by farmers and cattle breeders (Melathria was later renamed Dion). He recognized under the vegetation the ancient Hellenistic theater, the stadium and parts of the city wall. The French archaeologist Léon Heuzey confirmed the discovery in 1855. He mapped parts of the city wall, found the foundations of some towers and noted the inscriptions of some tombstones.

From 1912, the year of the liberation of Macedonia by the Ottomans, the ancient Dion was given more attention. The archaeologist G. P. Oikonomos collected and published all the inscriptions he found in the vicinity of Dion.

The Rector of the University of Thessaloniki and Professor of Archeology, Georgios Sotiriadis, began with the first excavations. They began in June 1928 with the aim of finding the sanctuary of Zeus Olympios. He found and examined several of the tumuli within the city walls. Also, a basilica from early Christian times was discovered. The assumption that a temple was under the basilica proved to be deceptive after which one had dug five meters deep. The most important find of this first period of excavation was a Macedonian vault from the 4th century BC, Which had already been plundered by grave-robbers in ancient times. The excavations were discontinued in 1931.

Charalambos Makaronas found a second Macedonian grave in 1955. A third grave was discovered a year later.

From 1961 Georgios Bakalakis resumed the works. In 1962, a large part of the city walls and the defensive towers were discovered during the mapping of the previously known excavation site. During the excavation phase under G. Bakalakis, the Roman theater was located, which extends southeast of the Hellenistic theater. The excavations at the early Christian basilica were completed by Stylianos Pelekanidis.

From the summer of 1973, the work was continued under the direction of Professor Dimitrios Pandermalis (University of Thessaloniki). His first goal was to explore the remains of two buildings south of the city area. The excavations revealed the Demeter sanctuary. In the same year, finds of statues of Asklepios, Hygeia and Telesphoros showed that also the Asklepios cult was practiced in Dion. On the main street the armor and the shields were released. The orchestras of the Hellenistic theater were then freed from the overlying layer of the earth. The theater dates from the 5th century BC; the Bacchae of Euripides were premiered here.

In the summer of 1976 excavations were carried out in the southeastern sector within the city wall. One came upon the great thermae. These were obviously destroyed by an earthquake. The mosaic of a bull in the frigidarium was separated into two parts, the lower part of which is 50 cm lower than the upper one. On the northern side of the baths were statues of the children of Asklepios.

Under difficult conditions the excavation work on the Isis Shrine took place. Spring water and mud caused the trenches to collapse frequently. A dam was built to continue the work. Again, there were signs of destruction by an earthquake with subsequent flooding. The excavations were completed in 1984.

The stadium was excavated in 1995 under the leadership of Giorgos Karadedos. Beside the playing field, several rows of seats were found.

In June 1987 the Dionysus mosaic was cleared and then protected by a roof construction against weather influences.

The sanctuary of Zeus Olympios was finally discovered in 2000 when investigations were made on the site near the Roman theater.

After a flooding of the Isis Shrine of Archaeological Park in 2002, was decided to move the river Vaphyras a few yards westward, so that future floods can no longer harm the sanctuary. In the course of this, artifacts were found which ultimately led to the excavation of the sanctuary of Zeus Hypsistos, the Almighty God. As the work approached its end, the cult statue of Zeus Hypsistos was found in the mud.

Beginning in 2007, under the leadership of Semeli Pingiatoglou, excavations were carried out with the aim of finding the oldest structures of ancient Dion.

The Dionysus mosaic was removed from its original place of discovery in 2015 and transferred to a specially built building (Archaeotheke).

The works are still continuing under the direction of the University of Thessaloniki.

== The sanctuaries ==
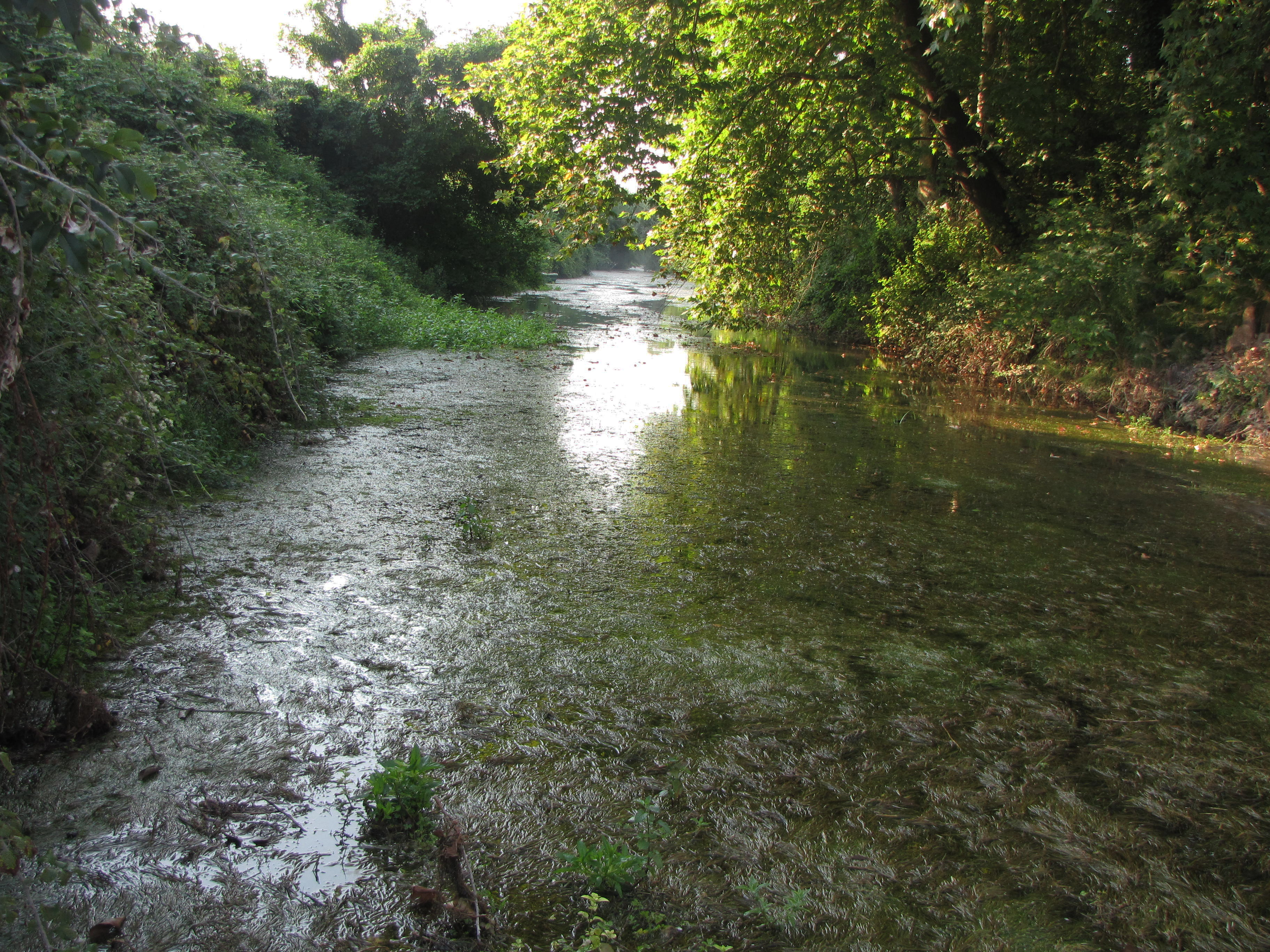
The river Vaphyras

=== Vaphyras ===
Although no special sanctuary was erected to him, the river Vaphyras was considered a divinity. About 100 m (330 ft) east of the park entrance is its source. The holy grove of the Muses probably grew here. The head of a statue representing the personalized river was found in the spring area. According to Hesiod, the Vaphyras originates from the cosmic river Okeanos, dominated by the primeval goddess Tethys.

An Artemis shrine discovered near the river is considered to be dedicated to the goddess Artemis Vaphyria. She watched the transition of young girls to the stage of marriageable women.

The river Vaphyras is interwoven in Greek mythology with Orpheus and the Muses. In the second century AD, Pausanias writes that the upper part of the Vaphyras bore the name of Helikon. Two-thirds of its length ran underground, before returning to Dion. According to Pausanias, however, this was not always the case. The inhabitants of Dion claimed that the Helikon flowed past Dion. But when the women who killed Orpheus wanted to wash the blood from their hands in the Helikon, the river dried up, for he did not wish to have any part in this act. Only in Dion did he appear again on the surface.

=== Demeter sanctuary ===
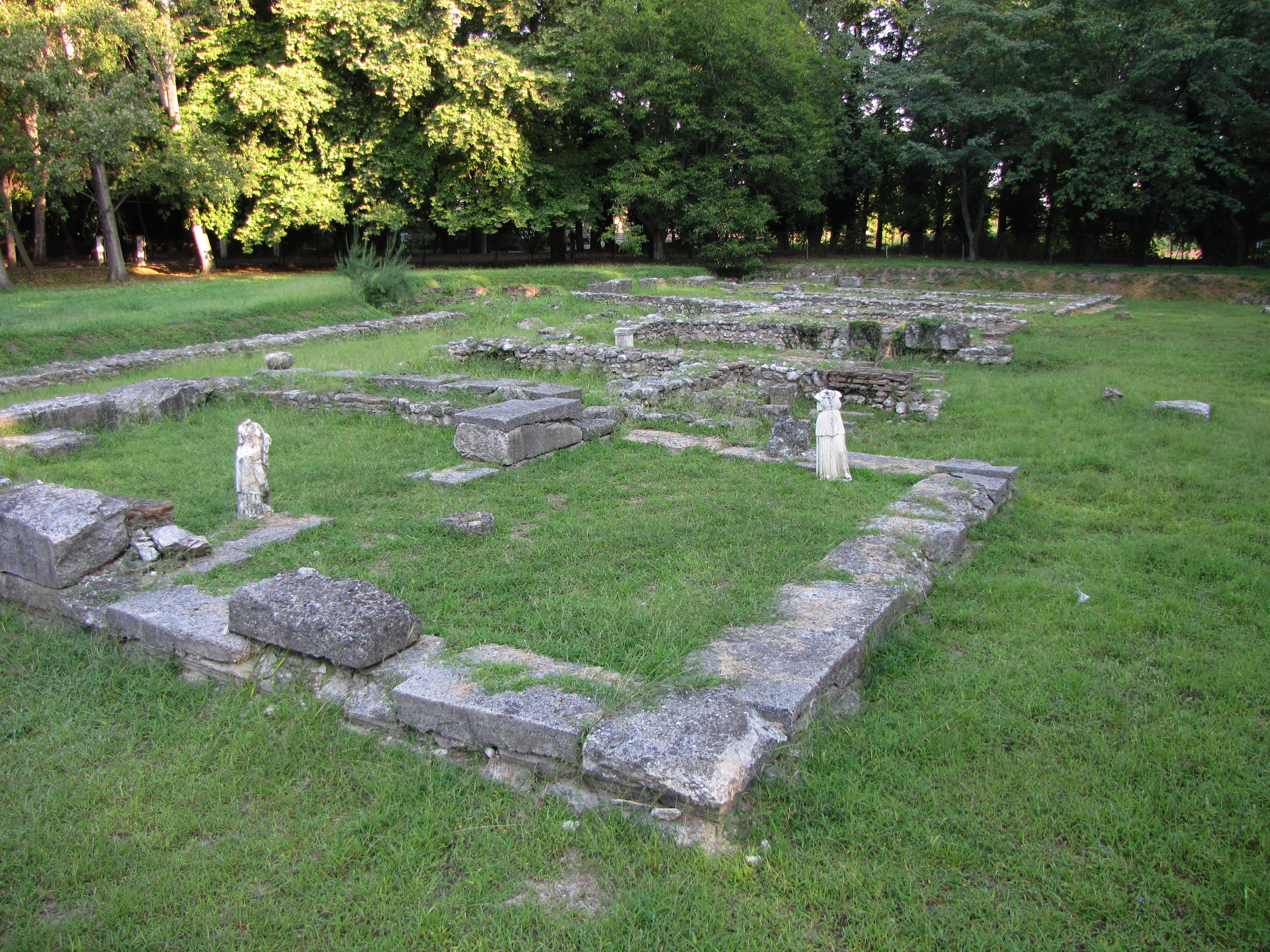
Sanctuary of Demeter

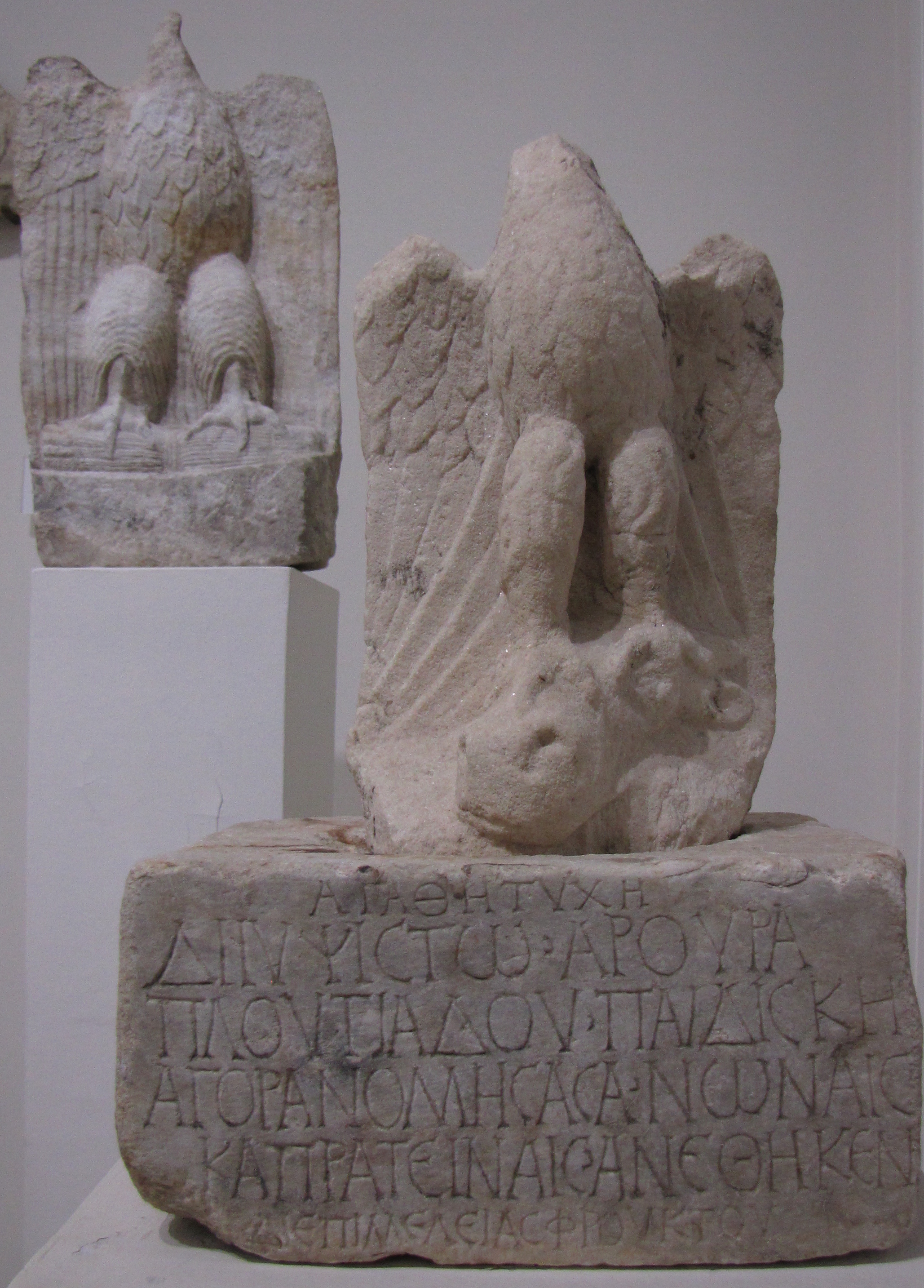
Arura, Maid of Plutiades, dedicates this to Zeus Hypsistos with the help of Fructus, after serving as Agoranomos during the Nonae Capratinae

It consists of several temples and is dated from the archaic period up to the Roman period. The sanctuary of Asklepios is located in the immediate vicinity. The connection between the two sanctuaries is also evident at other archaeological sites in Greece.

In the open, walled-in area, the goddess was offered liquid sacrifices. The oldest remains of the sanctuary are also found here. End of the 4th century BC two archaic temples were replaced by two Doric temples. Small, one-room temples (Oikos) were consecrated to the gods of the earth like Baubo and Kurotrophos. They were hoped for rich harvest yields. Another temple was erected in honor of Aphrodite. The faithful hoped for increased fertility. In front of the temples there were altars on which carnal sacrifices were offered to the respective gods. Vegetable sacrifices, such as grain or fruit, were spread out on so-called cult tables. Archaeological finds and ancient records have given the water an important role in the Demeter cult. It was among the duties of the priestesses to ensure that pure water was always available. In addition to cleaning rituals, water was seen as the necessary element to allow plant growth. Two circular wells are among the oldest structures of the temple.

In addition to the usual finds such as statues, pottery, jewelry, oil lamps etc., one found a ring stone from Mycenaean time. It dates from the 14th to 15th century BC, and shows a schematically represented lion in front of a tree. The artifact is a reference to the earlier settlement of Dion. 1990 the foundations of an altar were discovered east of the temple; At this point 1973 the head of a statue of the goddess was recovered.

In the Late antiquity there were kilns on the grounds of the Demeter Shrine.

=== Asclepios sanctuary ===
In the fourth century BC, The Asclepion was built. A place was chosen with plenty of water, because it played a special role in the practice of the Asclepion cult. It served the healing of the sick and was needed for the cult practices. So far, the foundations of a building that consisted of two rooms were cleared. The discovery of a toilet near the sanctuary suggests that people (pilgrims) were there for some time to cure their ailments.

=== Zeus Hypsistos sanctuary ===
A sacred road led to the sanctuary of Zeus Hypsistos (Greek Ζευς ὕψιστος "Zeus the highest god"). It was lined with small columns with marble eagles sitting there. These are devotions for the "Most Holy". The road led to a large square, on which stood a temple. It consisted of several rooms. In the northernmost room, the temple of Zeus, a statue of Zeus Hypsistos and the figure of a marble eagle were found. The floor was decorated with mosaic, which retained the image of two ravens. Also the floor of the overall building was mosaic. There remained a white bull and double axes. On the western side is a water basin. In front of the temple stands an altar, to the base of which a metal ring was attached, which served to tie the sacrificial animals. Both gods, Zeus Hypsistos and Zeus Olympios, were simultaneously venerated. While Zeus Olympios ruled the people from the top of Mount Olympus, Zeus Hypsistos dominated the sky, that is, all the supernatural.

==== Nonae Capratinae ====
Following the conquest of Dion by the Romans, the Nonae Capratinae was held on 7 July of the year. Female slaves enjoyed certain freedoms at this festival; one of them received the rights of Agoranomos that day. The Agoranomos (composed of the Greek words agora, market, and nomos, law) supervised the trading on the marketplace, set prices and had other tasks. From the inscription of an eagle statuette found in the sanctuary of Zeus Hypsistus in September 2003, it appears that Arura, the servant (probably a slave) of Plutiades, was elected Agoranomos. This statuette is the first proof that the Nonae Capratinae was also celebrated in the Roman provinces, outside of Italy. The connection between the worship of Zeus Hypsistos and the Nonae Capratinae was probably in honor of Jupiter Capitolinus, the Jupiter Optimus Maximus.

=== Zeus Olympios sanctuary ===
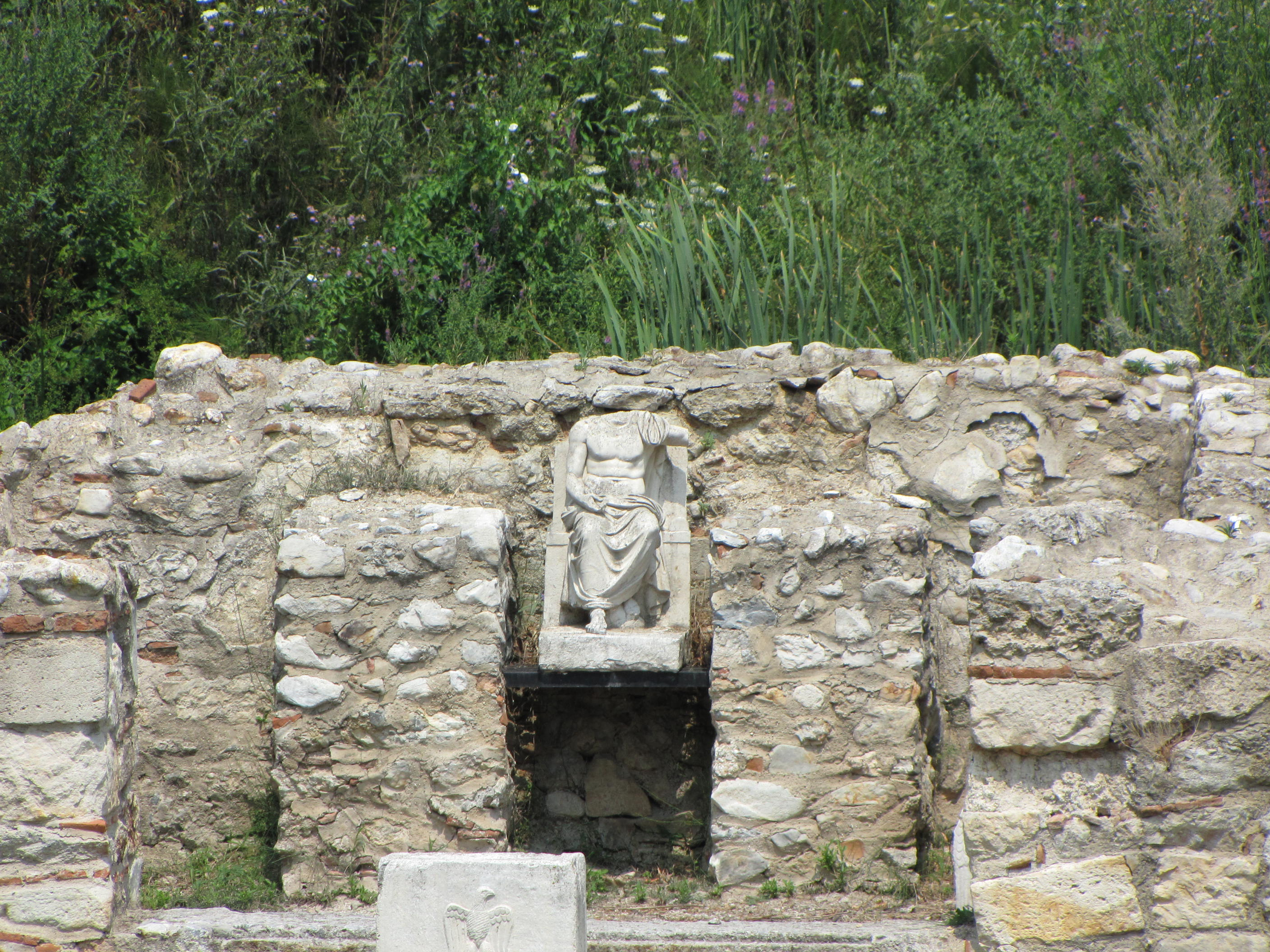
Zeus Hypsistos

In the Hellenistic period a powerful temple was built on a sacred grove consecrated to Zeus. In this sanctuary were gilded statues of the Macedonian kings. The bronze statues of his cavaliers who had fallen in the Battle of the Granikos were also erected in the Zeus Olympios shrine. The central square within the building was occupied by a 22 m-long (72 ft) altar. The sacrificial animals were tied to metal rings. In the sacrificial ceremonies, the most important part of the Zeus cult, 100 cattle were sacrificed.

When the Aitolean league attacked Dion, the sanctuary was destroyed. But it was rebuilt immediately by the materials of the surrounding buildings by the Macedonian King Philip V.

==== The Zeus cult in Dion ====
At the time of the reign of the Macedonian kings, the sanctuary of Zeus Olympios was the most important sanctuary of the city and the religious center of Macedonia. It has not yet been clarified whether the shrine was given its importance by the Olympic Games initiated by King Archelaus, or whether, inspired by Homer's Iliad, it had already played a central role for the region. Deucalion claimed that in Dion, after the sanctuary of Zeus Lykaios, the second oldest altar devoted to Zeus was erected. From the late 8th century BC, Zeus was worshiped at various places in Greece. It was common to all these Zeus sanctuaries that they took place on the summit of a mountain, or near a summit. Inscriptions, pottery and remains of charcoal from the Hellenistic and Roman period on the summit of Agios Antonios (2817 m) near Dion, testify that the cult of Zeus was practiced not only in Dion, as also on Mount Olympus. The Macedonian kings used the temple to archive their royal decrees. Some of them are exhibited in the Archaeological Museum of Dion.

=== Isis sanctuary ===
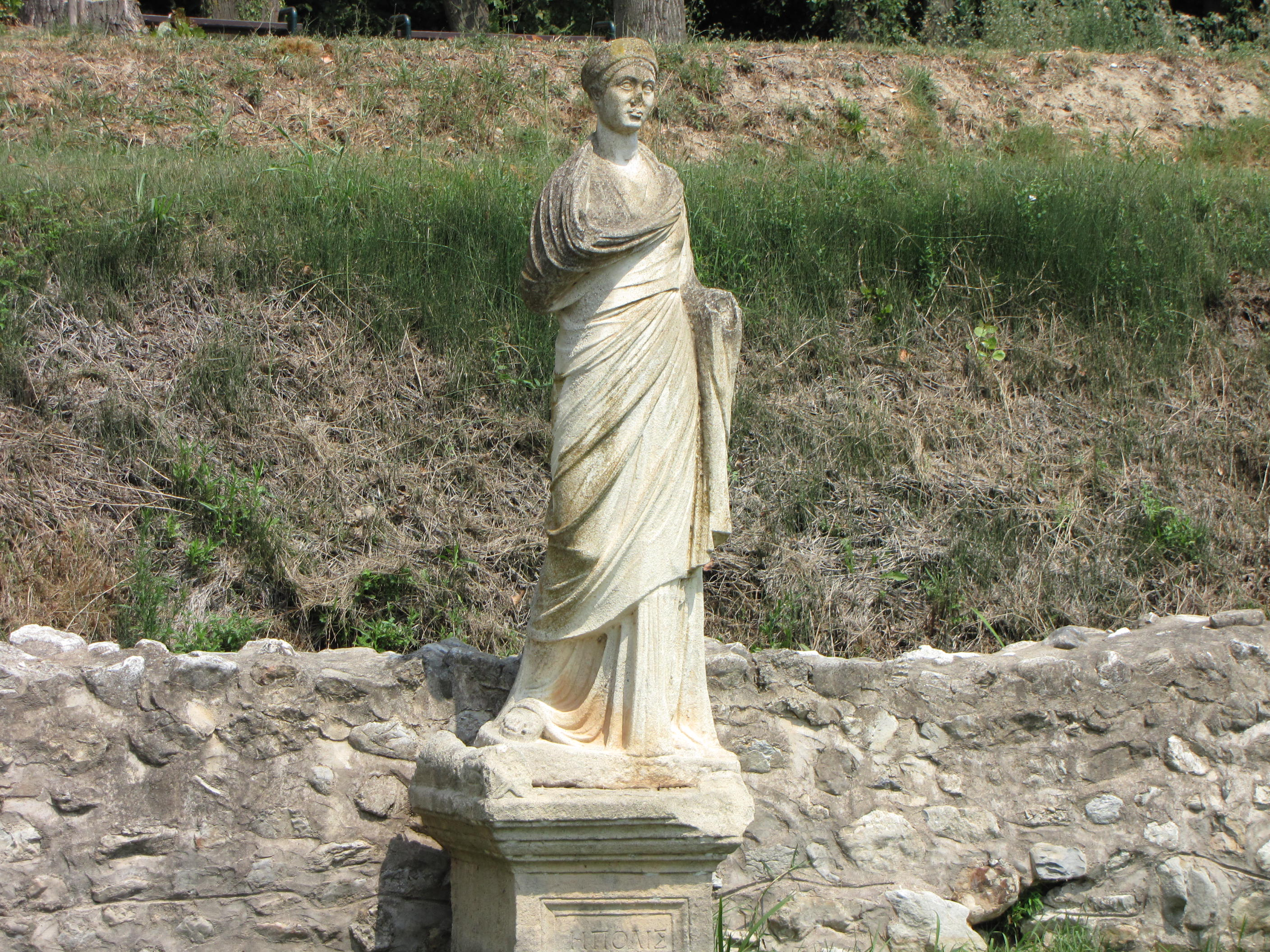
The Isis Sanctuary

The most recent of the sanctuaries in Dion is the sanctuary of Isis. It was erected in the second century AD on the site of a former fertility sanctuary. The plant has a considerable size and is traversed by a channel, which is to symbolize the river Nile. The main entrance is in the east, i.e. the side facing the sea. A minor entrance is found on the north side of the sanctuary. The temple and altar of Isis Lochia (Isis as the guardian of the child's bed) are framed in the western part of the complex by two smaller temples of Isis Tyche and the Aphrodite Hypolympiada. In these little temples, springs are still active. In the cult of Isis, water was given sacred meaning. Two rooms, which are located in the north of the temple complex, served as a sanctuary for hypnotherapy, while figures of the patrons of the sanctuary were placed in the other room.

== The Macedonian tombs ==
In the course of the first excavations, a vaulted Macedonian grave with a Doric façade from the 4th century BC was found. The marble doors were broken, the grave was robbed by grave robbers. A funerary couch of marble with the representation of a battle of cavalry and parts of a frieze, displaying lions, remained.

A second grave was excavated in 1955. It contained a stone couch, the floor was designed with colored pebbles.

One year later, a third grave was released. Next to a stone couch, there were three pedestals.

The fourth grave was discovered in 1979. A funerary couch with ivory inserts hid behind the marble gates.

The last grave was found in 1988. Among the finds was a silver quarter-drachmae with depicting Alexander the Great and a golden Charon's penny (Charons Obolus), in which the name "Epigenis" was engraved.

As burial objects gold jewelry, golden and silver coins, glass bottles that may have contained perfumes, glass jars, and a copper mirror had been found. Some tombstones, as well as the burial objects, are displayed in the Archaeological Museum.

== The theatres ==
=== Hellinistic theatre ===
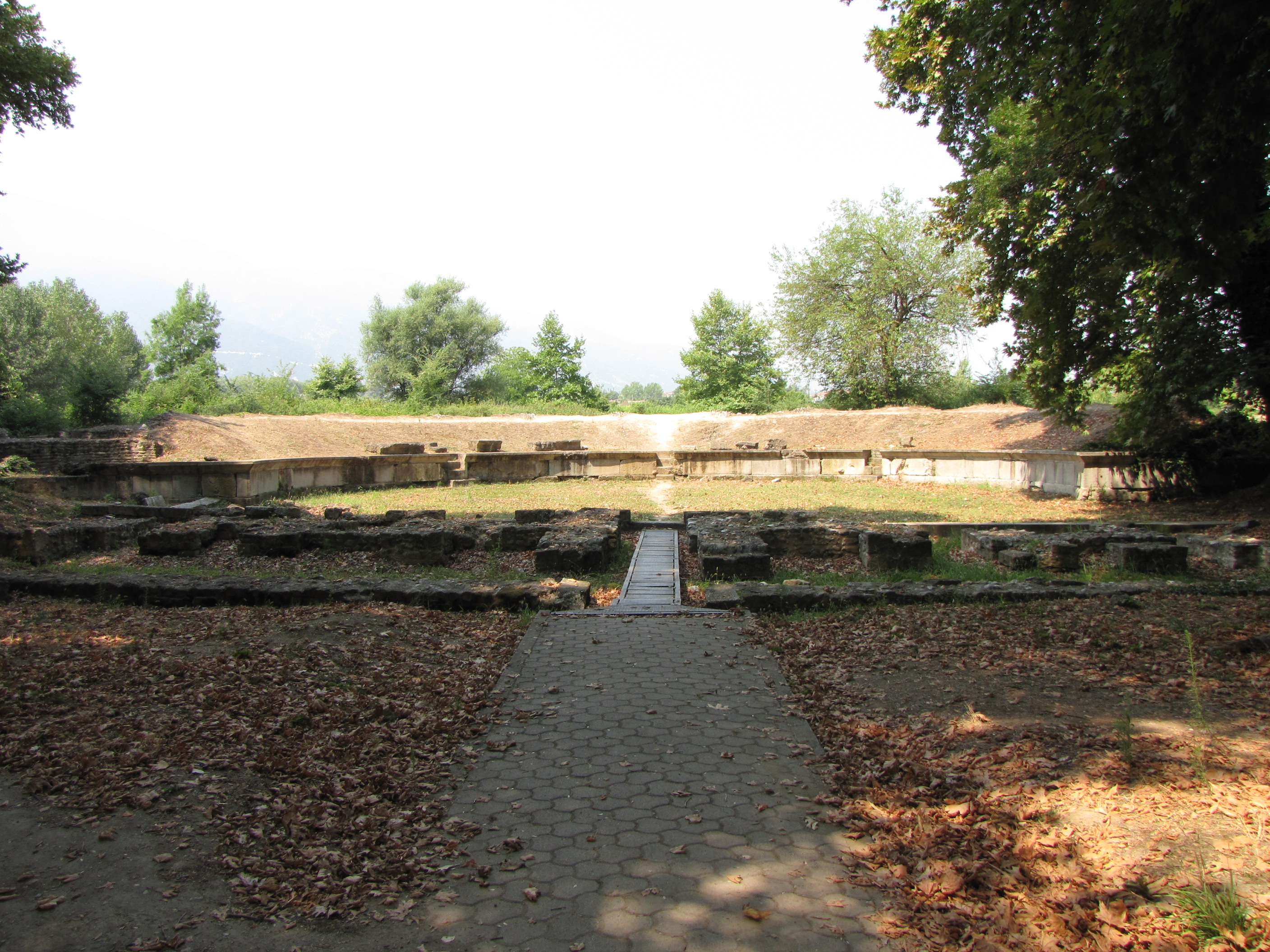
The Roman Theatre

The classical theater, in which the premiere of the Bacchae of Euripides took place, was replaced in the 3rd century BC by the Hellenistic theater. A semi-circular mound of earth was laid on which brick-built seats were placed. A digging around the round orchestra ensures the drainage of the rainwater. Underground rooms and hallways allowed the appearance and disappearance of actors and objects. The stage was slightly higher than the orchestra. There were devices which allowed for special effects. The theater is used today, after a further modernization, for the annual "Olympus Festival".

=== Roman theatre ===
The Roman theater was built in the 2nd century AD. It had 24 rows of seats arranged in a semicircle. Below the row of seats were 14 brick vaults. The orchestra had a diameter of about 21 meters (69 ft). The building was built of bricks, field stones and mortar. The stage and the koilon (the auditorium, the seats) were separated; The stage was decorated with marble elements. Among the exhibits excavated there was a statue of Hermes.

== The ancient city ==
=== The city walls ===
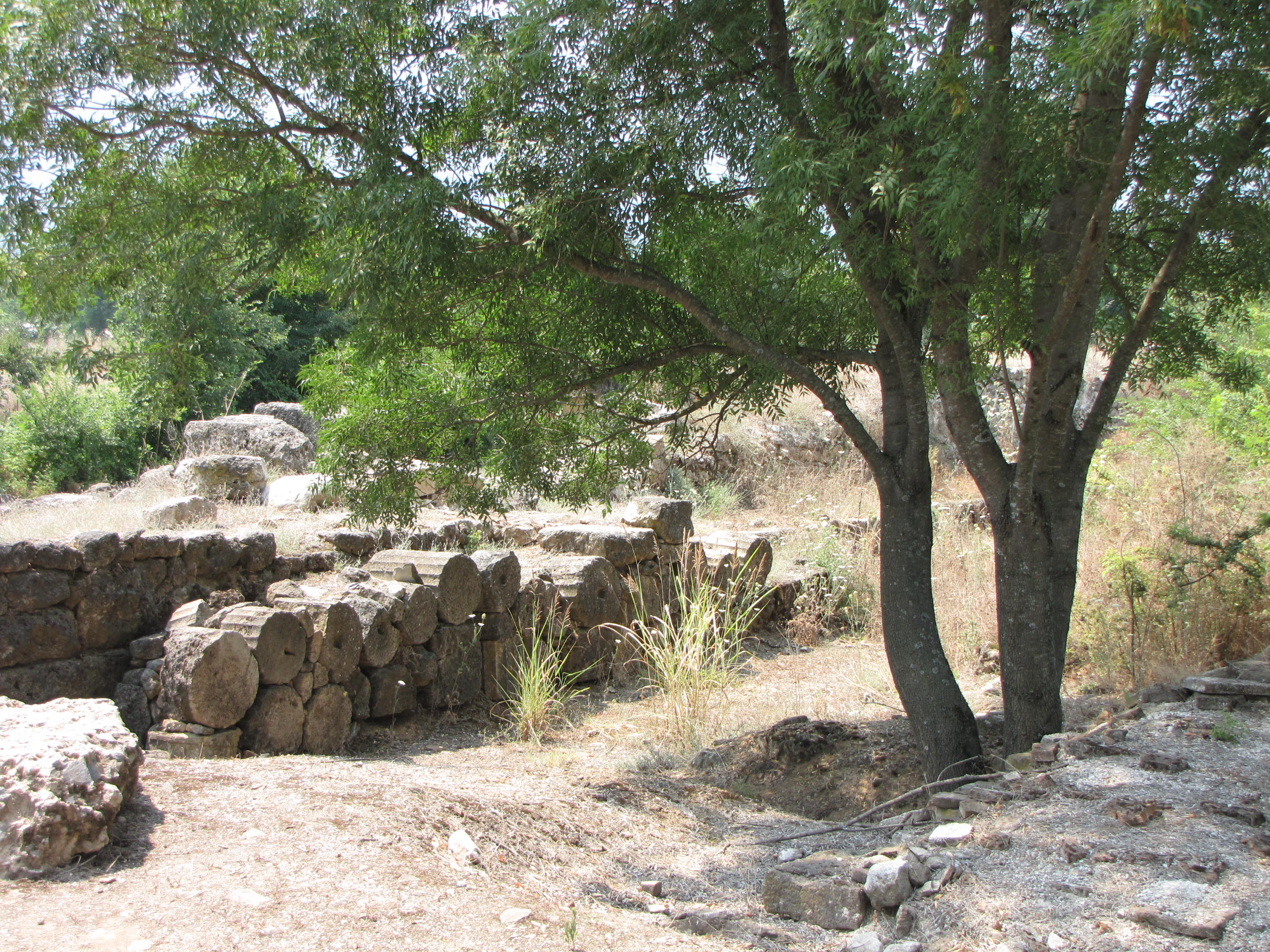
Remains of the City wall

Since Dion was one of the few ancient Greek cities that lay in a single plane without any elevation, the city wall was particularly important in defense against attackers. In the east, the Vaphyras' marsh formed some protection, but there was neither a natural elevation nor an acropolis.

The city wall was built from the limestone of Mount Olympus between 306 and 304 BC, under the rule of the Macedonian king Kassander. It was 2625 meters long, three meters thick and seven to ten meters high. The western side is 642 m (2,106 ft) long, the southern and northern sections each 682 m (2,238 ft) long. The eastern part of the fortification has not yet been completely excavated. At a distance of 33 meters (100 Doric feet, 32.8 cm) stood towers with a floor area of seven by seven meters. In the southern and northern wall sections were two city gates, in the western part one city gate was found.

At the river Vaphyras, to the east of the town, there was probably a port facility. After the attack of the Aitolians (219 BC), in which the city wall was partly destroyed, the protective barrier was repaired immediately. He was given little attention during Roman domination. Sometimes even the masonry fell apart. When the attacks on Dion were piling up in the 3rd century AD, the city wall was repaired. Old sculptures and remains of other buildings were used as building materials. Floods by the Helikon and Vaphyras rivers during the early Christian era considerably reduced the urban area of Dion. The city wall had then only a length of 1,600 meters (5,200 ft). New walls were built on the north and east sides of the town. Column remains, sculptures and altars were used as building materials. In the 5th century AD the city wall was destroyed, probably by an earthquake. It was not rebuilt afterwards; This lack of protection may have been a reason why the population gradually left the village.

=== The houses ===
In the course of the excavations, private houses were brought to light in various parts of the complex. Almost all have mosaic flooring. The names of the former owners occasionally come from preserved parts of a mosaic, or from stamping the lead pipes, which served the water supply. In addition to mosaics, statues, columns, remains of furniture, busts and others were found.

==== The Villa of Dionysus ====
The most important private building in the city is the Villa of Dionysus. In 1982, archaeologists started exploring the area east of the main road. They found a long-stretched building in the south-western part of which were shops and a bathing establishment. The bathroom could not only be entered from the street but had a separate entrance from the neighboring house. Further excavations brought to light statues of Dionysus, a Nike, and parts of other statues and statuettes. In June 1987 a large mosaic was found in the spacious atrium, which later became named Dionysusmosaic. Obviously, the atrium served as the dining room of the property. Among other finds in this room were a sculpture of four seated philosophers, the statuette of a satyr and a statuette of Heracles. In 1989, four more rooms of the villa were exposed. While two of them had less interesting finds, the third room found four clay storage vessels. In the last room there was a damaged mosaic that represents in its midst the head of a Medusa. There was also a statue of Heracles with a club, bow, arrows, lion's skin and a statue of a deer. Two years earlier, the work in the atrium already found the head of the deer and the hand of Heracles holding the bow. Works in the year 1990 brought parts of a statue to light which is a copy of the "Eros with a Bow" of the sculptor Lysippus.

=== The thermal baths ===
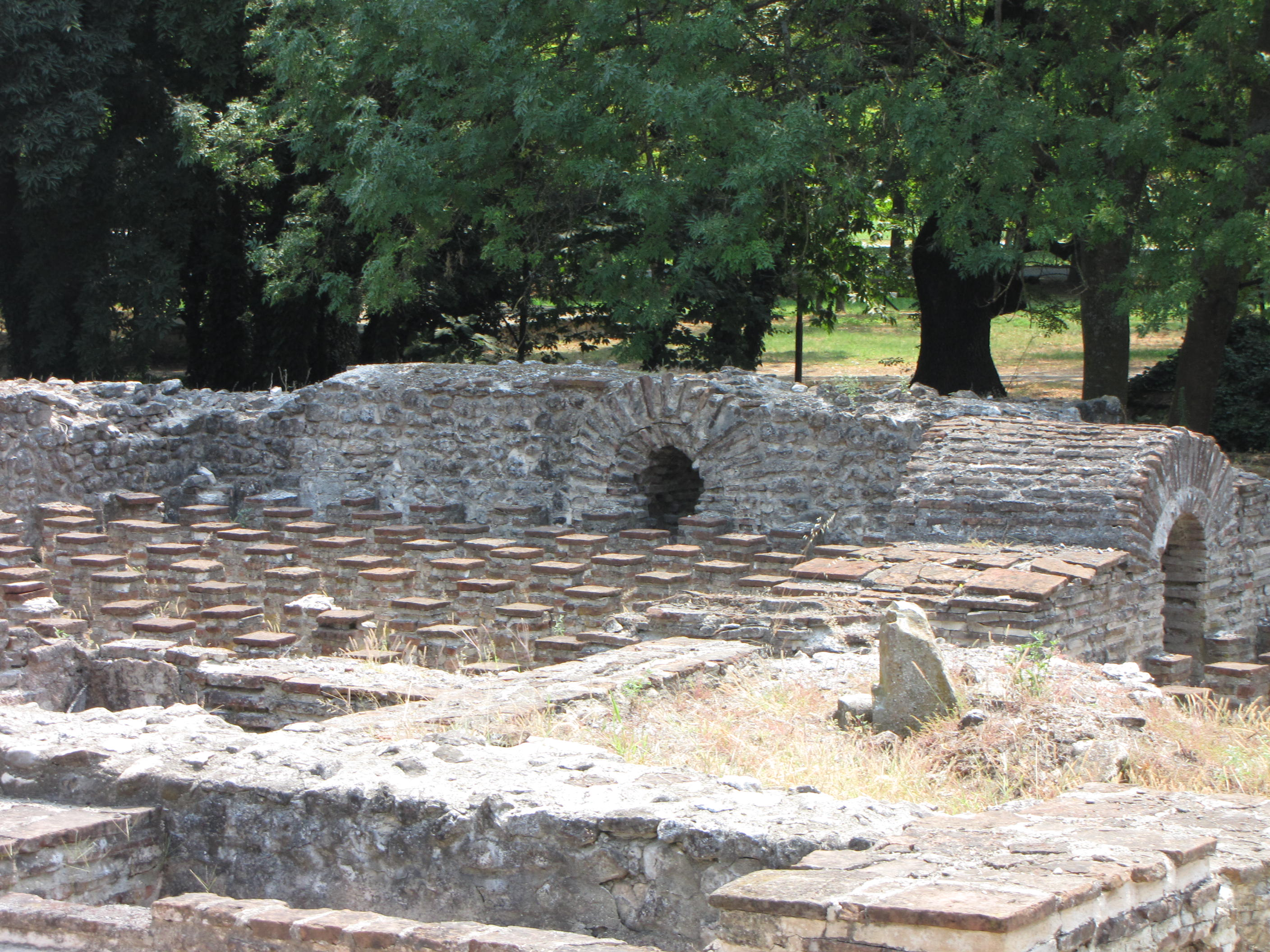
The Thermal Baths

All the thermal baths have the same structure as they have a pool with cold water basins and other basins with differently tempered water. Also the type of heating, by a hypocaust-system lying under the floor, is the same for all mentioned thermal baths.

The great thermal baths were built in the 2nd century AD. A hall covered with a mosaic floor leads to the bathing cabins and the water basins. There were rooms where Asclepios was worshiped. Since the thermal baths also served as a place for social gatherings, an Odeon was built for social events such as readings, plays, or musical performances in the complex. The shops and toilets were still part of the thermal baths.

The so-called "thermal baths of the main street" are located east of the main street, opposite the wall with the stone armors and shields. The equipment was comparable to the large thermal baths, the area was only a lot smaller.

The thermal baths on the market can be found at the north-east end of the Roman market. Mosaic flooring and a reception hall decorated with paintings are the special features of these baths.

=== The Odeon ===
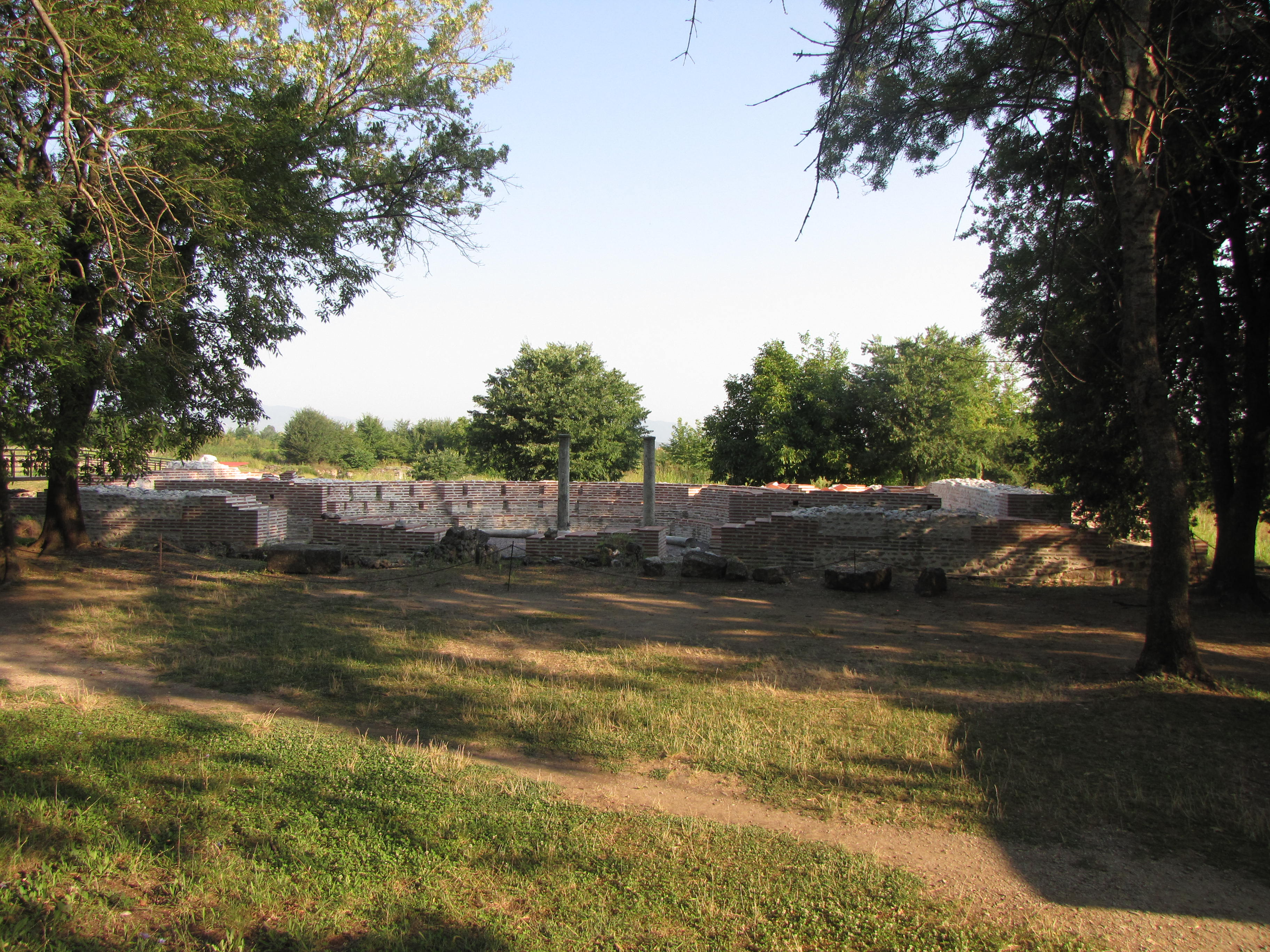
The Odeon after restoration

==== History and construction ====
Built in the 2nd century AD, the Odeon is part of the large thermal baths. The outer mass is 28.46 by 19.46 m (93.4 by 63.8 ft); it offered 400 seats arranged in the form of an amphitheatre around the semicircular orchestra. The excavations of the Odeon began in September 1977 and lasted for two years. The elements of an ancient theater with orchestra, koilon, four interior staircases, stage and two L-shaped staircases were found. The carefully executed stonework work combines Roman architecture with local craftsmanship. The 1.55 m-thick (5.1 ft) outer wall was a major static element; She caught the side pressure of the Koilon and supported the roof. The walls of the building were built of limestone or burnt bricks. The excavations revealed how the building was destroyed. The great cracks in the walls, as well as the lowering of the ground and some walls, indicate a strong earthquake with subsequent fire. In 1990, excavations were once again carried out to measure the entire ground plan of the Odeon for the planned restoration; Shards from the classic period were found.

==== Restoration ====
The natural stresses where the remains of the Odeon were exposed to, heat, frost and moisture, destroyed parts of the building material (mortar, wood) over the centuries. The binding effect of the mortar subsided and the remaining foundation walls fell apart. The top part of the construction suffered the most, large blocks of the building dissolved and fell. The aim of the restoration was the preservation and reinforcement of the remains of the Odeon. The old mortar was sealed and cracks in the masonry were closed with fresh mortar. The fallen parts of the masonry were moved to their original place and fixed. The final work consisted of building a straight bearing surface from surrounding stones and covering them with specially made bricks. The material of the bricks corresponds to that of the ancient bricks. In the University of Thessaloniki the ancient bricks were examined and their composition determined. The composition of the mortar was determined according to laboratory tests and established in collaboration with the Management Committee for the Conservation of Ancient and Modern Monuments of the Ministry of Culture and Sport. The original construction was covered with lead before restoration. Thus, the old building fabric is severely separated from the new building materials. The floor of the Odeon was covered with pebbles and the architectural elements found on the site, such as columns, were erected in their original place.

The financing for the protection, conservation and restoration of the Odeon was taken from the EU program "Macedonia-Thrace 2007-2013". The works were based on the studies of Professor G. Karadedos, University of Thessaloniki.

=== The water supply ===
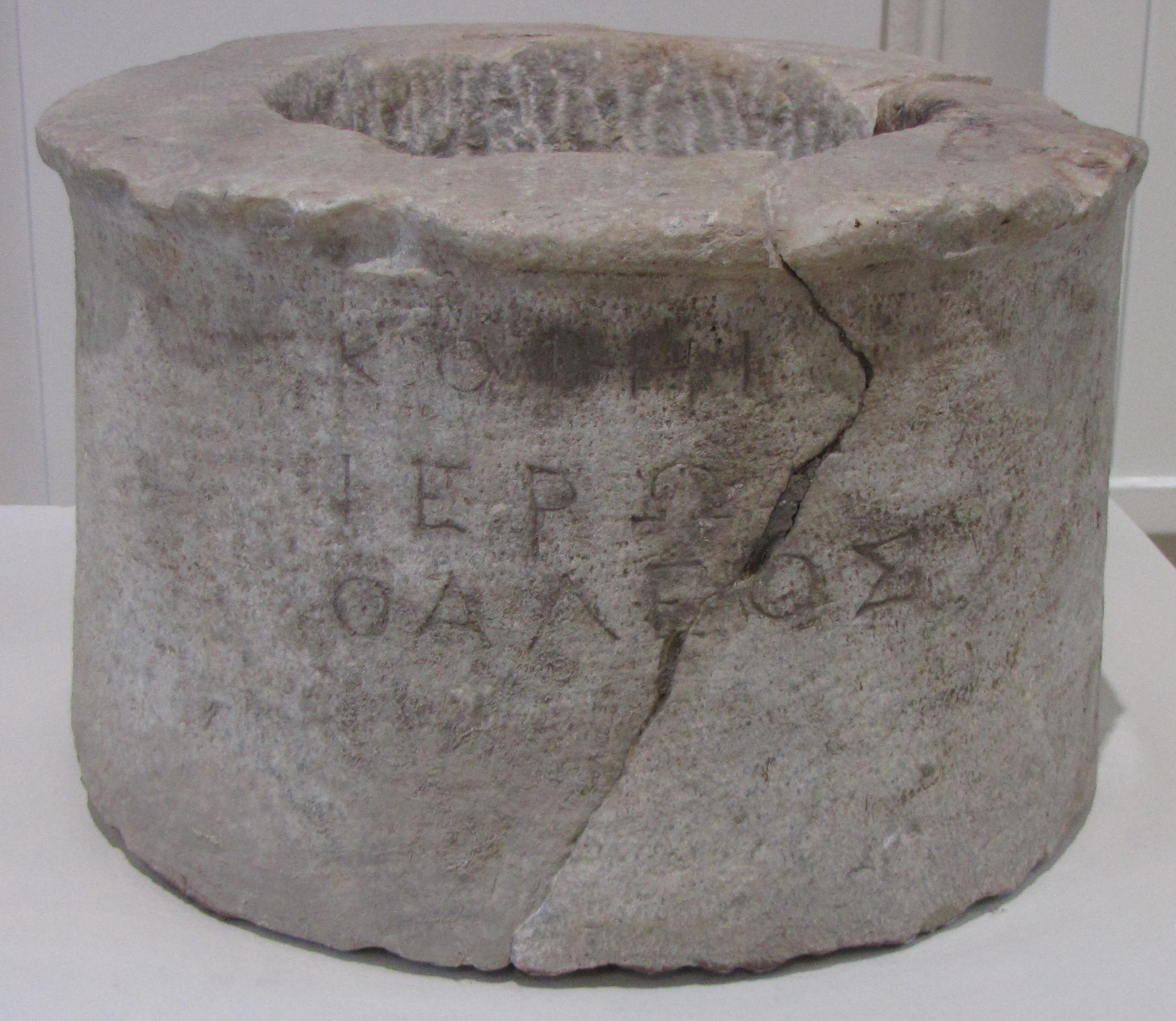
Part of a well, Isis sanctuary Dion

The ancient Dion got its water from the Helikon River, 5 kilometres away. From there, water pipes were moved to Dion.

Partly they were underground, some were built as an aqueduct. Parts of the aqueduct were found in a ravine northwest of the city. Within the city, the water gathered in a large cistern, from which the distribution was carried out in underground pipes to other cisterns or wells. Clay and lead were used as material for the water pipes. The central cistern was built in the 2nd century AD of stone and clay bricks. Two wells, which took care of households and baths, were located in the northeast and southeast of the city area. A third well was, after the destruction of the main cistern by an earthquake, replaced by a smaller cistern.

Despite the organized water supply separate wells existed. So far, seven of them have been located and excavated. They are divided into three different types:

- Wells which were built with rough stones and later plastered.
- Wells with wedge-shaped bricks.
- Well whose shaft was lined with clay tubes.

=== The Roman market ===
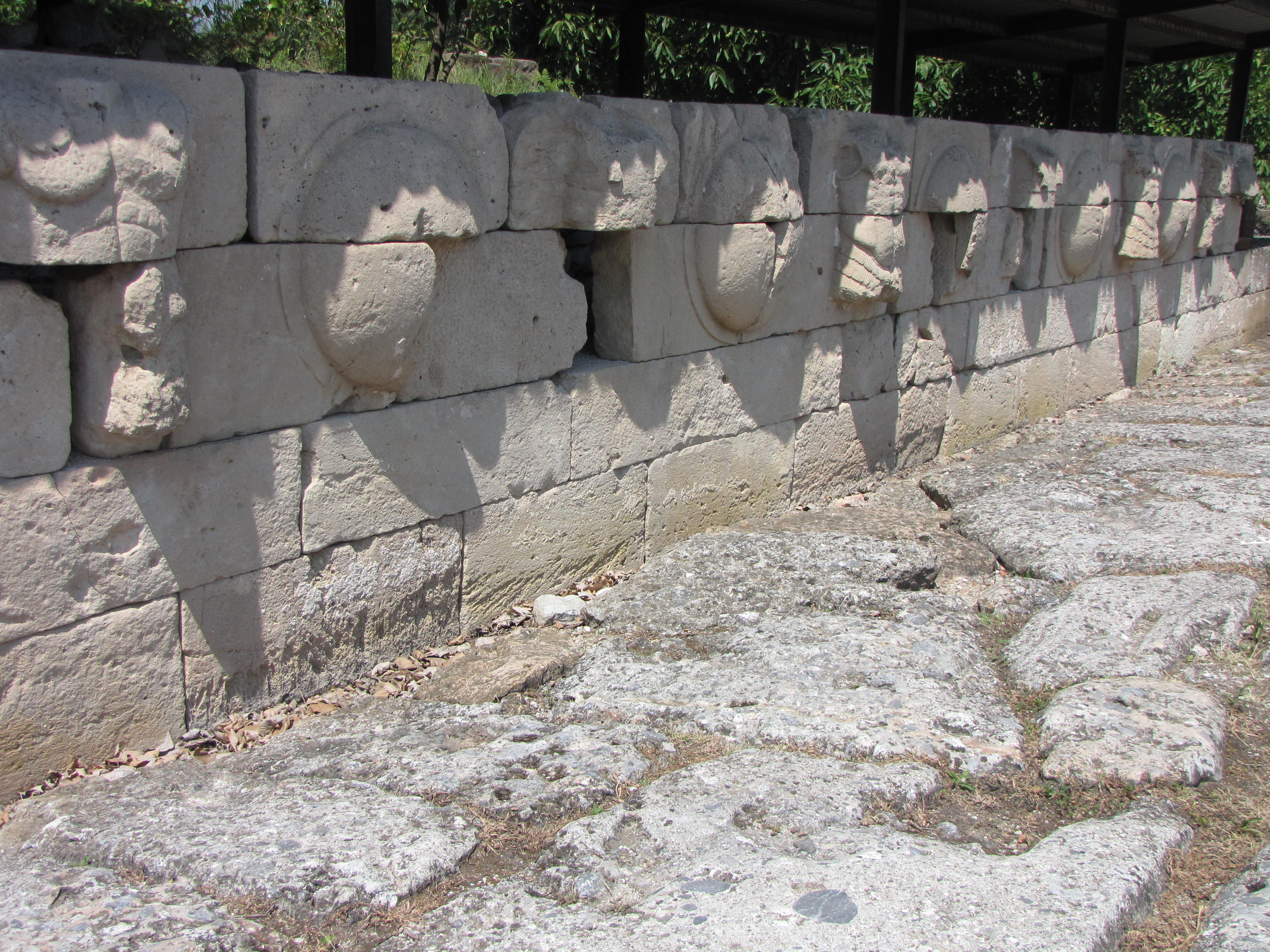
Armour and Shields

It is an open space surrounded by shops and halls. On the side facing the mountains, in the middle of the building surrounding the market, there was a temple (Sebasteion) presumably consecrated to the Roman emperors. The floor is slightly above the level of the market square and is decorated with mosaic. Inside, there were remains of murals and fragments of male statues. To the east of the square, opposite the temple, stood a Roman basilica. It was decorated with the frieze of armor and shields, which is now to the west of the main road. Under the supervision of the local authority, banking operations were conducted and commercial contracts were concluded in the basilica.

=== The Praetorium ===
Near the Villa of Dionysus, on the main road, is the Praetorium located. The building was used as a hostel for officials and emissaries as well as to accommodate ordinary travelers (Taberna). A locally found Latin inscription designates the building as Praetorium with two Tabernae. The entrance was on the south side; in the eastern part of the complex were five bedrooms and a luxurious dining room, the Triclinium. The Tabernae consisted of two larger rooms in the western wing. Here the archaeologists found earthen storage vessels and some lamps. Between Praetorium and the Tabernae was probably a stable. Public toilets were accessible to both, the guests and the city's population. A source served the hygiene, underground channels derived the dirty water.

=== The polygonal building ===
At the intersection of the main street and the west gate leading street is the polygonal building. It covers about 1,400 m^{2} (15,000 sq ft) and probably served as a market hall. The complex is square and was built around a dodecagonal square. The square was surrounded by an arcade connecting the rooms of the building. The access was on the south side. A floor mosaic shows two wrestling athletes and two slaves with rucksacks.

=== Churches ===
==== The episcopal basilica ====
At its last heyday, when the church appointed Dion to be the seat of a bishop, the basilica of the bishop was built in two phases of construction in the 4th and 5th centuries. It was a three-nave church with narthex. The remains of the walls are painted, the floor was mosaic. A smaller building, situated to the west of the church, served as a baptistery. An earthquake at the end of the fourth century destroyed the building. On its foundations a church was erected, in which the baptistery was integrated. The baptismal font had the shape of a Maltese cross.

==== The cemetery church ====
In the middle of the cemetery, a three-nave church was built at the beginning of the 5th century. The center ship had a mosaic floor; Narthex and side ships were covered with clay tiles. Under the floor of the church, graves were discovered. Later on, a grain store were added to the building and a vault where the church treasury was kept.

== Study on environmental influences on the ancient building materials in the archaeological park of Dion ==
In 2015, members of the Aristotle University, Thessaloniki, published a study on the condition of the stone building materials of the Asklepion and the Demeter Sanctuary. The aim of the study was to investigate the decay of the stone monuments and remains of buildings in the archaeological park of Dion. Mainly it was to be researched which environmental influences participate in which form in the decay process of the antique building materials in order to possibly preserve them. The building materials consist mainly of limestone, sandstone, conglomerate and marble.

The environmental conditions:

- High humidity, frequent rainfall
- Great temperature fluctuations
- High occurrence of surface and groundwater
- Increased chemical, biological and mechanical weathering by the surrounding plants and trees

Mostly the surfaces are covered with salt and a black crust containing calcium, magnesium, soda, potash and other substances.

The studies were performed by using different microscopes and a spectrometer. From December 2010 to November 2011, monthly samples of precipitation were taken. These samples and water samples of the Vaphyras and other waters were analyzed. The temperature fluctuations of the rocks were measured with infrared thermometers.

The researchers found various organic and inorganic substances that influence the weathering of the monuments. However, the main factor influencing the decomposition of the material is the penetration of water. In combination with heat and cold, it reduces the cohesion of the surface structure and thus leads to the instability of the ancient building material.

== The archaeological walk ==
The archaeological walk takes place every year as part of the Olympus Festival. Teachers of the Aristotle University of Thessaloniki guiding through the archaeological park and inform about various topics that touch ancient Dion. The arc spans from Greek mythology, the kingdom of Macedonia and the individual attractions of the park to daily life in the days of Alexander the Great. Embedded in the program is the performance of a short play or the recitation of ancient texts.

== Literature ==
- Dimitrios Pandermalis: Dion. The archaeological site and the museum. Athens 1997
- Directorate General for Antiquities and Cultural Heritage: The Odeum of the great Thermae of Dion, Greek ministry for culture and sport, 2015
