= Dion Yatras =

Zimbabwean cricketer (born 1968)

Personal information
- Born: 26 August 1969 (age 57); Umtali, Manicaland, Rhodesia
- Batting: Right-handed
- Bowling: Right-arm medium

Domestic team information
- Years: Team
- 1999/2000–2001/02: Manicaland

Career statistics
| Competition | FC |
|---|---|
| Matches | 6 |
| Runs scored | 120 |
| Batting average | 17.14 |
| 100s/50s | 0/0 |
| Top score | 32 |
| Balls bowled | 30 |
| Wickets | 0 |
| Bowling average | – |
| 5 wickets in innings | – |
| 10 wickets in match | – |
| Best bowling | – |
| Catches/stumpings | 5/– |
- Source: ESPNcricinfo, 14 July 2021

Dion Yatras (born 26 August 1968) is a former Zimbabwean cricketer. A right-handed batsman and right-arm medium pace bowler, he played six first-class matches for Manicaland between 2000 and 2002.

He was born in Umtali (now Mutare), the son of Spiro Yatras.
