= Mitsubishi Dion =

Mitsubishi Dion (CR)
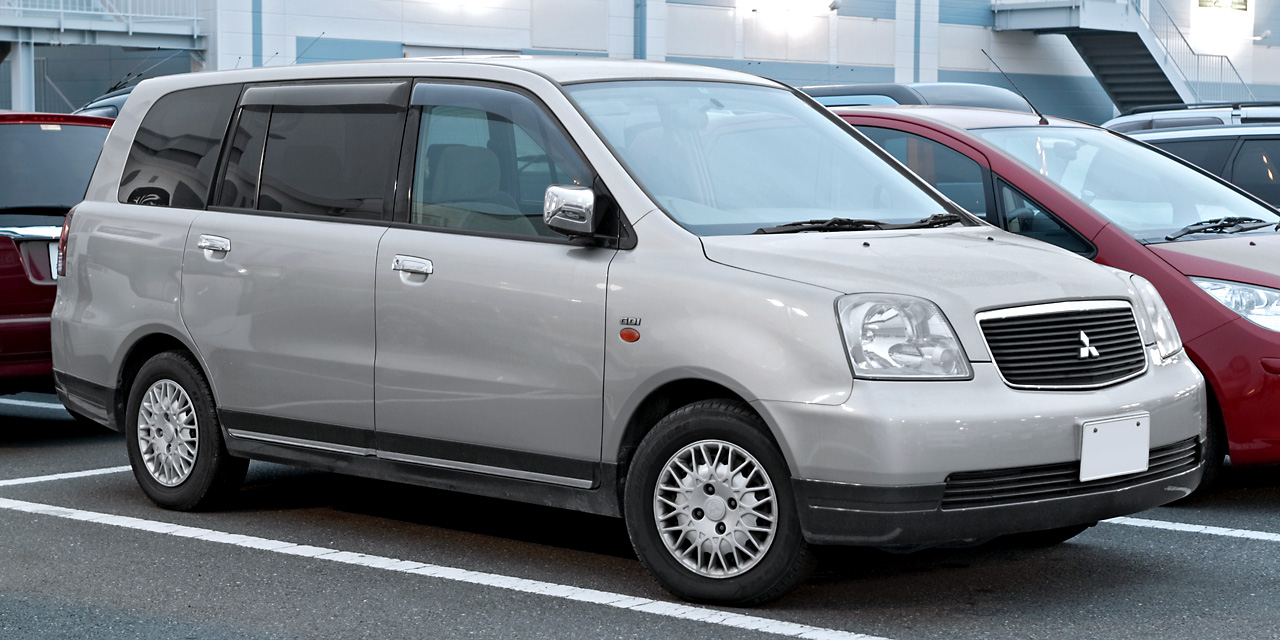
- Pre-facelift Mitsubishi Dion

Overview
- Manufacturer: Mitsubishi Motors
- Production: 2000–2005
- Assembly: Japan: Kurashiki, Okayama (Mizushima plant)

Body and chassis
- Class: Compact MPV
- Body style: 5-door wagon

Powertrain
- Engine: 2.0 L I4; 1.8 L GDI I4; 2.0 L GDI I4
- Transmission: INVECS-II 4-speed semi-auto

Dimensions
- Wheelbase: 2,705 mm (106.5 in)
- Length: 4,460 mm (175.6 in)
- Width: 1,695 mm (66.7 in)
- Height: 1,650 mm (65.0 in)
- Curb weight: 1,380–1,460 mm (54.3–57.5 in)

Chronology
- Successor: Mitsubishi Delica D:5; Mitsubishi Delica D:3

The Mitsubishi Dion is a compact MPV produced by Japanese automaker Mitsubishi Motors. Following its exhibition at the 1999 Tokyo Motor Show, it was introduced on January 25, 2000 priced from ¥1,598,000–1,848,000, it was built on a stretched Lancer/Mirage platform, with seven seats in a 2–3–2 configuration. The name was derived from Dionysus, the Greek god of wine and joy.

A facelifted Dion was launched in Japan in May 2002.

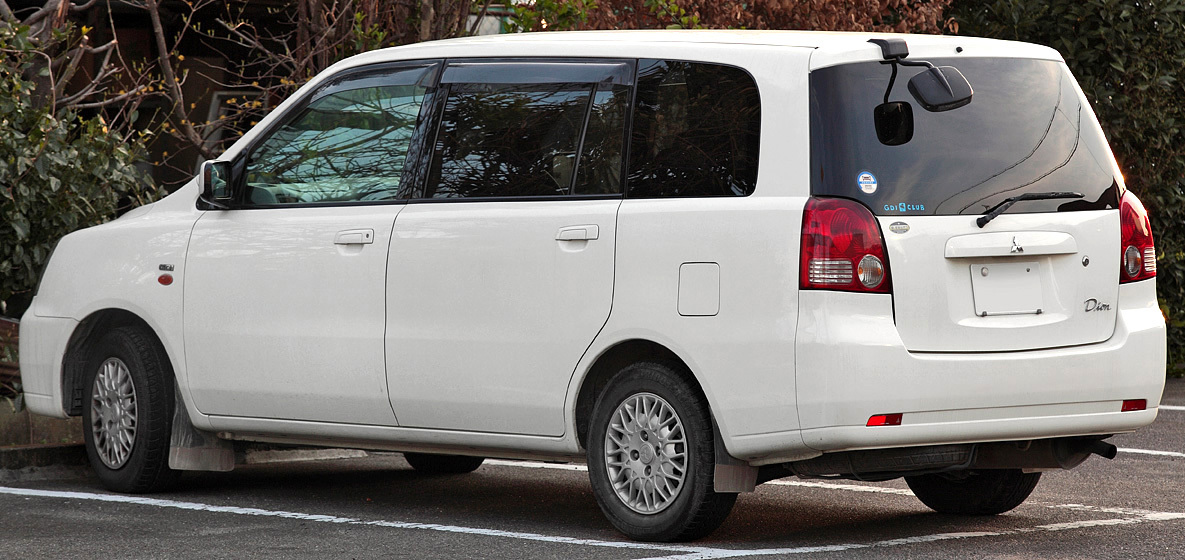
Rear view (pre-facelift)

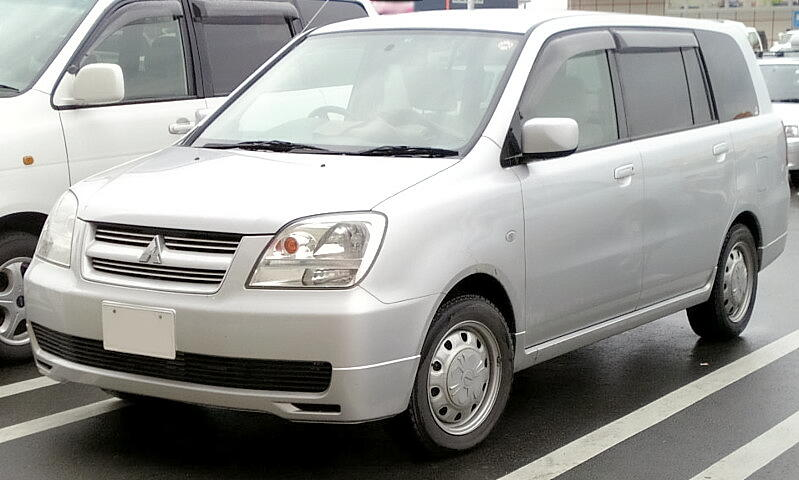
Facelift Mitsubishi Dion

== Annual production and sales ==
The company's initial sales target for the car was 4,500 in the first month, a figure exceeded by 1,000 after the first two weeks.

Year	Production	Sales
1999	15,282	n/a
2000	30,977	30,225
2001	9,699	10,601
2002	5,696	5,925
2003	1,881	2,131
2004	2,697	2,382
2005	1,797	2,149
2006	-	33

(Sources: Facts & Figures 2000, Facts & Figures 2005, Facts & Figures 2007, Mitsubishi Motors website)
