= Dion (Thessaly) =

Dion (Δίον) or Dia (Δῖα or Δία) was a town of Phthiotis in ancient Thessaly. In 302 BCE, Cassander planned to transfer the town's population to nearby Phthiotic Thebes but this was prevented by Demetrius Poliorcetes.

Its site has tentatively been located at a place called Lichas Kastri.
