= Dium (Crete) =

Dium or Dion (Ancient Greek: Δίον) was a town of ancient Crete. Pliny the Elder speaks of it as an inland town. However, Ptolemy discusses a promontory on the north coast of Crete, at its greatest breadth, called Dium Promontorium (Δίον ἄκρον - Dion akron), leading some to suppose a connection to the town.
