= Dium (Pisidia) =

Ancient Greek town

Dium or Dion (Ancient Greek: Δῖον) was a town of Pisidia mentioned by Stephanus of Byzantium Its location is unknown.
