= Museums and exhibitions at Mount Olympus =

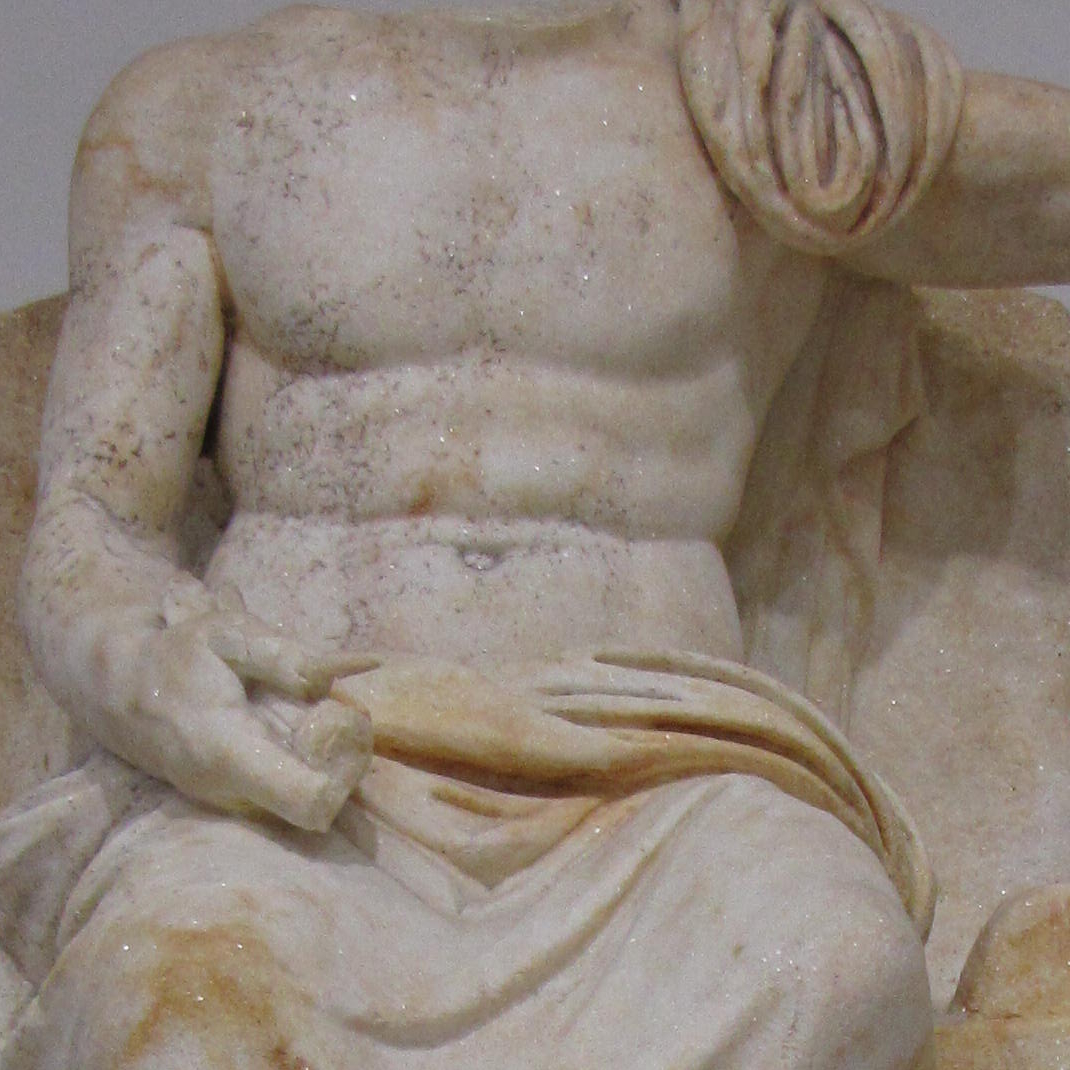
Details of a statue of Zeus Hypsistos, Archaeological museum, Dion

Archaeological and historical finds, as well as contemporary works of art are displayed in the museums and exhibitions at Mount Olympus.

== Archaeological Museum Dion ==
Here are the finds of the archaeological site of Dion and the surrounding area exhibited. The museum is divided into three floors. In the basement there are coins, pottery and antique building materials. On the ground floor is a small cinema, the exhibition shows mainly finds of the sanctuaries of Dion. Upstairs is the famous water organ, the Hydraulis. There are also changing exhibitions of archaeological finds from the wider area.

In a separate building, the Archaeotheke, the approximately 100 m^{2} mosaic of the Epiphany of Dionysus is displayed.

== Archaeological Museum Makrygialos ==
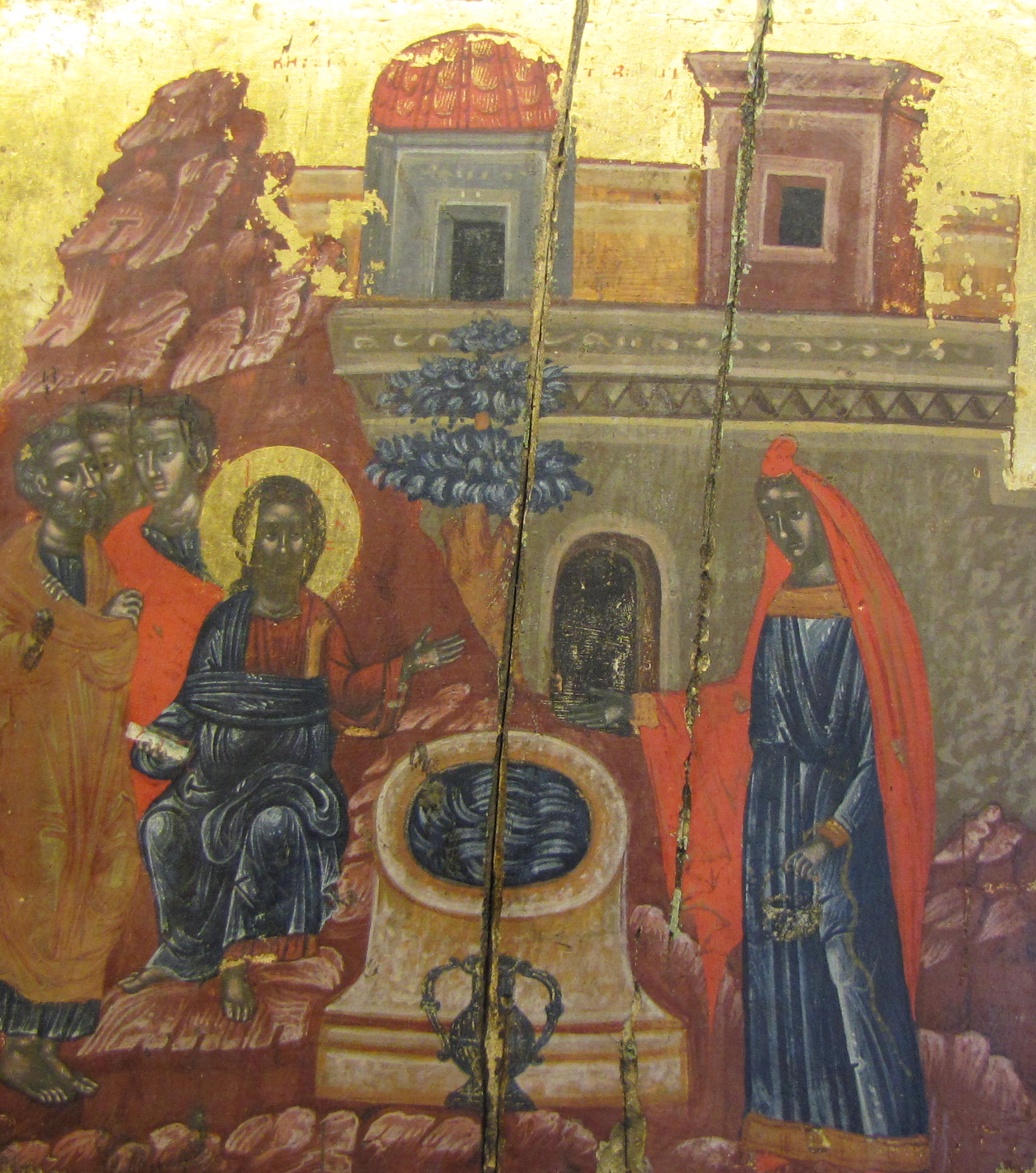
Icon from the 17. century, Agia Triada, Sparmos

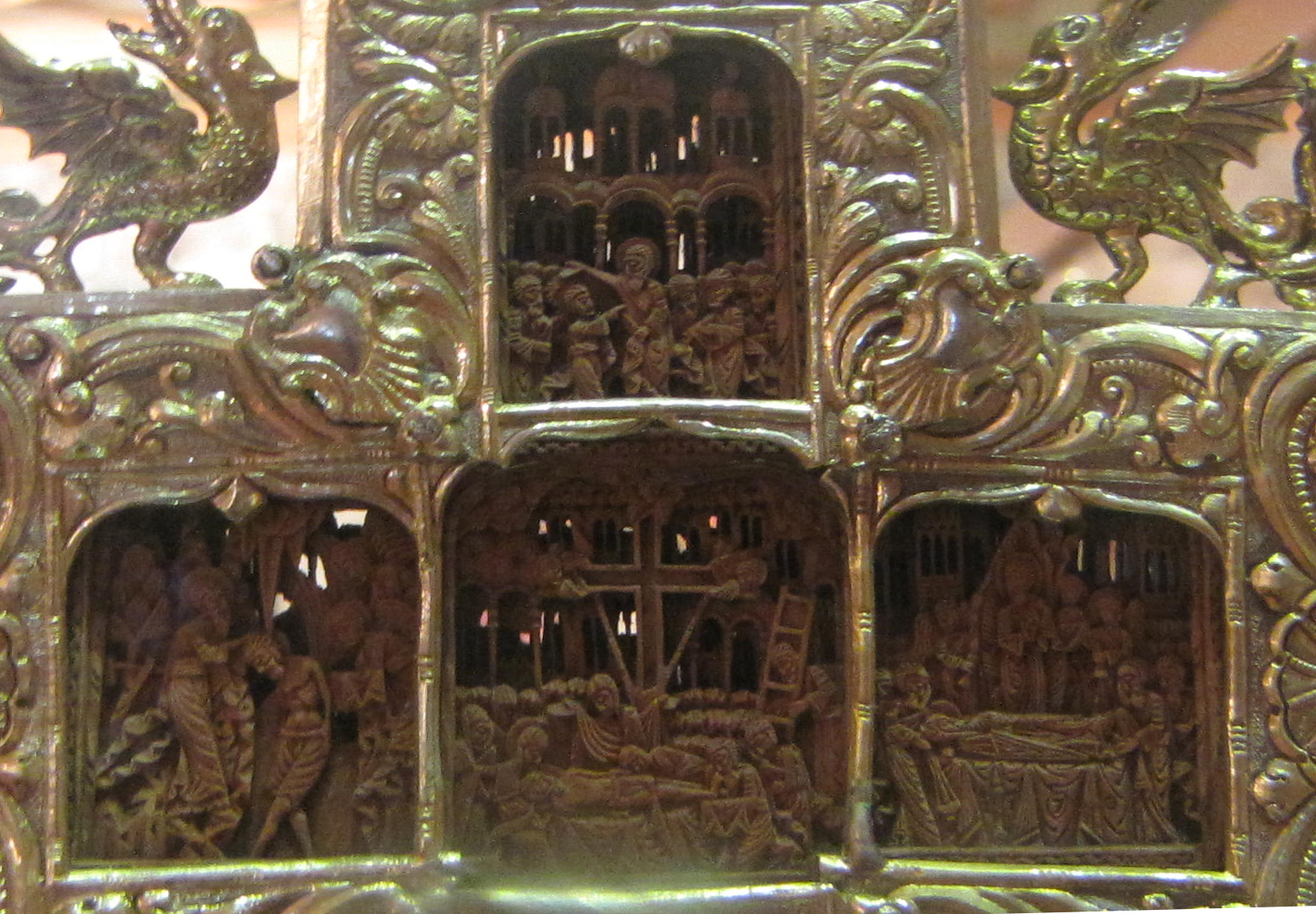
Miniature woodcarving within a metal cross. Agios Dionysios, Litochoro

The ground floor of the building houses the offices of archaeologists, the laboratory and workshops, the museum is upstairs. Currently, only a few of the many finds from Pydna, the necropolis of Pydna, Methone, Makrygialos and its surroundings can be seen in the museum. Some smaller, mostly clay exhibits and amphorae, some of which are used as urns or sarcophagi for toddlers, are exhibited. The museum is not open to the public yet.

== Alexandrion, Litochoro ==
The building, built by Greek Macedonians living abroad, deals with the life and work of Alexander the Great. In addition to the permanent exhibition, the building also serves representative purposes.

== Museum of the Agia Triada Monastery, Sparmos ==
Exhibits of the museum include icons from the 17th century, precious vestments, old wood carvings and books, written and bound by the monks of the monastery. During the liberation struggle against the Ottomans, the monks stored food and ammunition for the militants and cared for the wounded.

== Museum of the Monastery Agios Dionysios, Litochoro ==
Historical documents, from the document approving the construction of the monastery, to photographs of a soldier of the German Wehrmacht, which show the old monastery shortly before its destruction, prove the past of the monastery. Released in silver are relics, vestments, an epitaph woven with silver threads, documents, books, icons and inlaid pieces of furniture. Above the museum is the library of the monastery, which is not accessible to the public.

== Geological Museum of Mount Olympus ==
Information boards and models explain the origin and geological structure of the Olympus. Displayed are fossils, any type of stones occurring in the mountains and photographs of geologically significant objects. Special exhibits are fossils of marine animals that were found in the Olympus at an altitude of about 1000 meters.

== Olympus National Park Information Center, Litochoro ==
The exhibition takes the visitor through all regions of the mountains. Starting from the village Litochoro, the animals and plants of different altitudes are explained by means of display boards in Greek and English language. Interactive screens allow 360° visibility from different locations; a small cinema shows a 3D movie about the Olympus massif. Furthermore, there is information about archaeological sites, monasteries, mythology, geology and the history of the first ascent of the summit.

== Nautical Museum of Litochoro ==
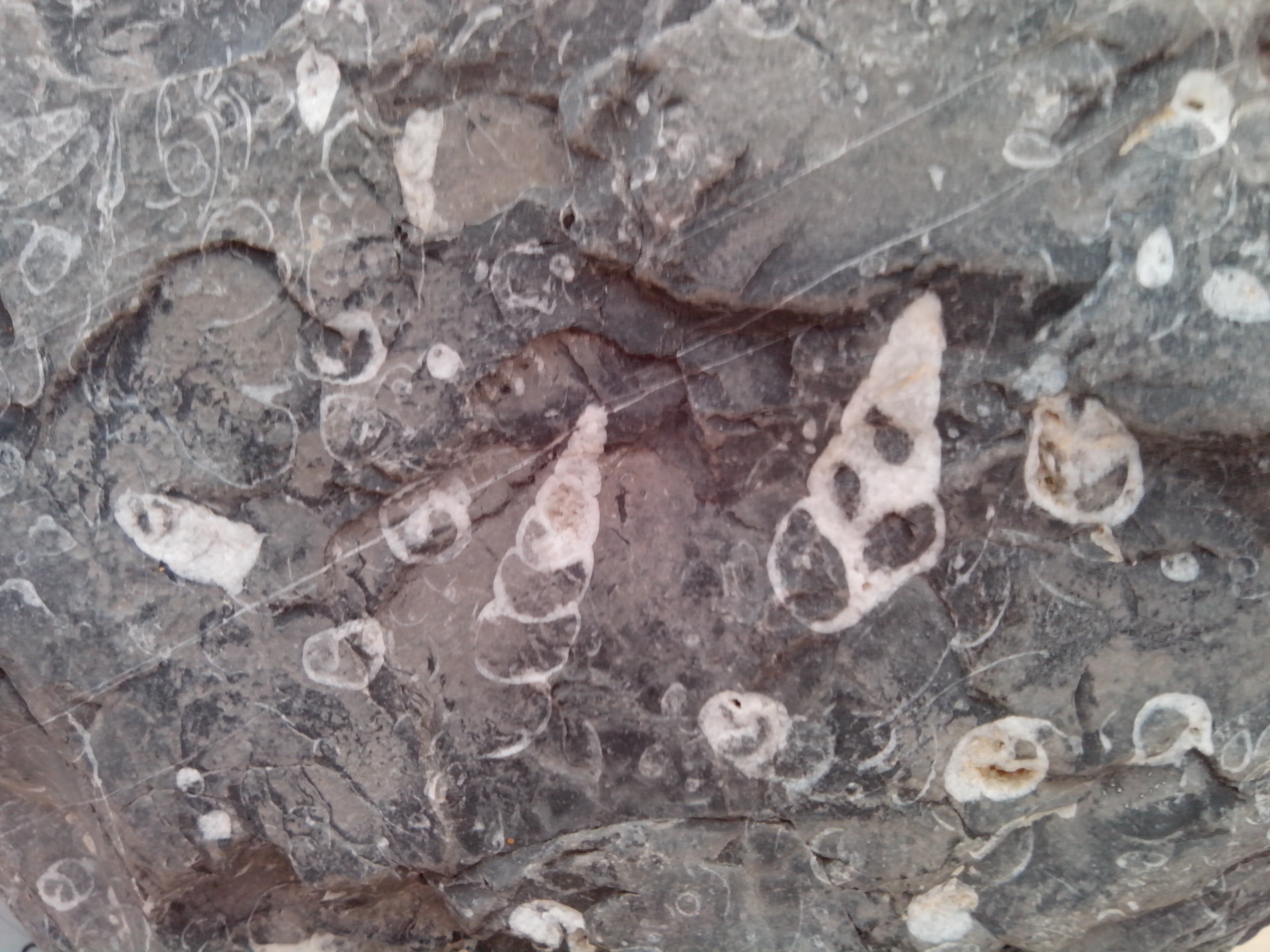
Fossils, Geological Museum of Mount Olympus

The Nautical Museum was founded to preserve the tradition of the merchant shipping industry. The exhibits are mainly from private ownership, partly from shipowners or the navy. Certificates, logbooks and old photographs are exhibited alongside nautical instruments and nautical objects. A special feature is the replica of the bridge of a merchant ship with all instruments.

== Mosaic center, Dion ==
During the summer months, exhibitions with changing themes take place here as part of the Olympus Festival. Frequently, the respective host country of the Olympus Festival uses the opportunity to present its art and culture here. Occasionally artists from Greece organize exhibitions of their works. You can see mosaics, paintings, photographs, sculptures, prints etc.

== Folklore Museum of Katerini ==
The museum is intended to preserve the culture of the Pontic Greeks, who come from the Black Sea region. On display are furniture, tools, costumes and embroidery. The replica of a typical residential building shows how people lived before their expulsion.

== Museum of the Syllogos Mikrasiaton Pierias ==
The exhibition follows the theme Asia Minor. The club shows in his museum pictures, photographs, traditional costumes, uniforms, traditional clothing and items for the daily use, mostly gifted from the refugees of Asia Minor.

== Literature ==
- Hellenic Republic, Ministry of culture and sports, Onassis Foundation USA, 2016: Gods and Mortals at Olympus. Edited by Dimitrios Pandermalis, ISBN 978-0-9906142-2-7
- Iera Moni Agias Triadas Sparmou: Iera Moni Agias Triadas Sparmou Olymbou (Ιέρα Μονή Αγίας Τριάδας Σπαρμόυ Ολυμπου). 2006, ISBN 960-89151-0-4
- Holy Patriarchal and Stavropegic Monastery of St. Dionysios of Olympus: I Iera Patriarchiki ke Stavropigiaki Moni tou Agiou Dionysiou tou en Olymbou. Hrsg.: Holy Patriarchal and Stavropegic Monastery of St. Dionysios of Olympus, 2014
