= Olympus Mountain running competitions =

Mountain running competitions in Greece

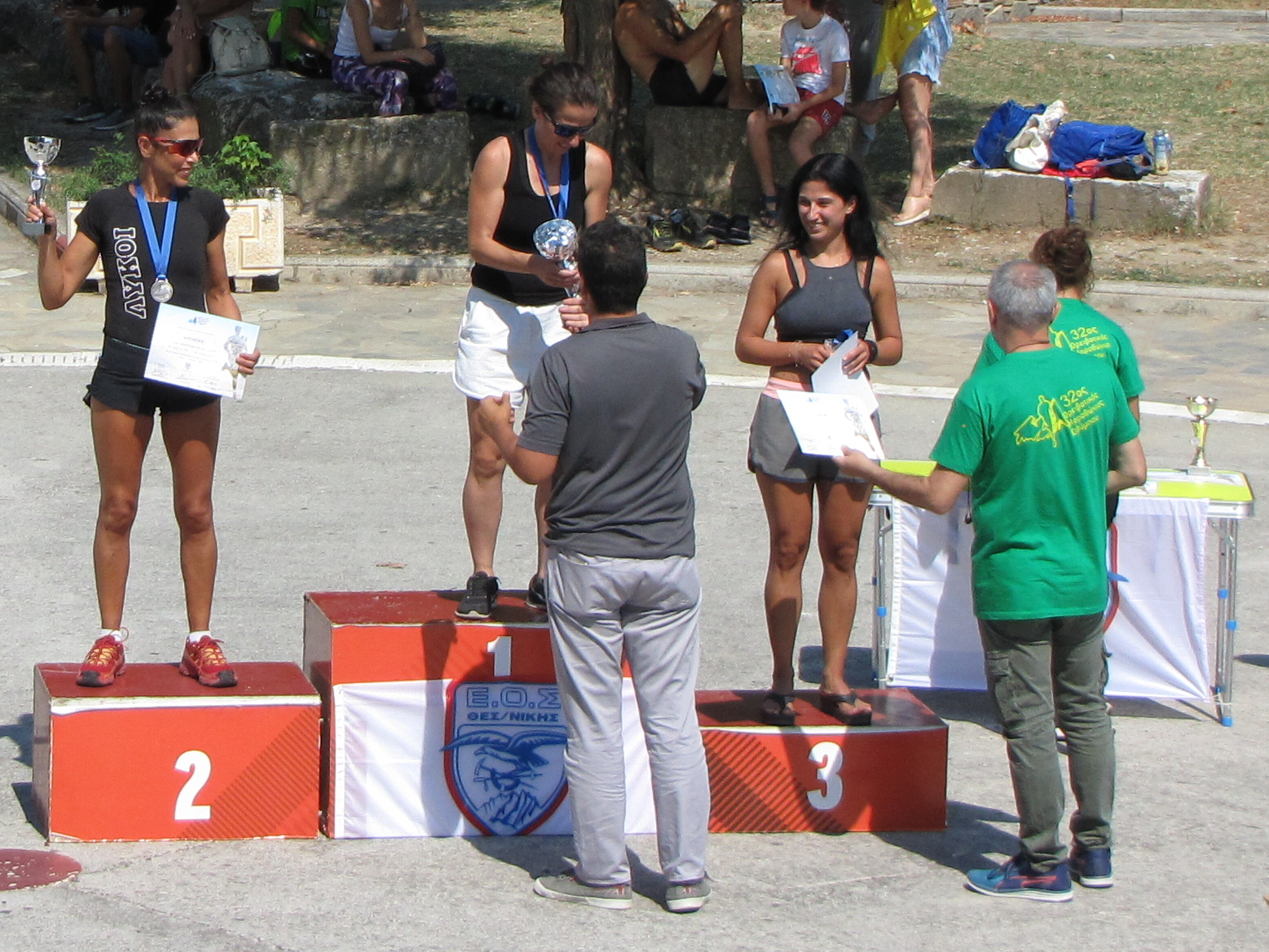
Award ceremony of the runners

Since 1986, nearly every year, various initiators organize marathons in the Olympus Mountains in Greece. For these Olympus Marathons the classic distance of 42.195 kilometers provides a clue to the distance of some of the runs in the Olympus. Starting in 2010, events established that surpass the classic marathon distance. In some races, runners run over distances of 57 km, 70 km or almost 100 km.

At the stations along the route, the runners are provided with drinks and snacks and mostly medical aid. They are offered water, electrolytic drinks, bananas, salty biscuits, sandwiches, chocolates and more. The medical care is provided by rescue services. The fastest runners finishes the race in about four hours.

== History ==
Around 1970, inspired by mountain running in the Alps, the first thoughts of a marathon in Olympus came on. Younger members of the Mountaineering Association E.O.S. Thessaloniki implemented the idea; a running track was selected, the paths were cleaned and marked. The first run took place on July 6, 1986. Around 100 Greek runners participated; although starting numbers have been assigned, there are no statistics on the results of this first Olympus Marathon. The new sport was called "Mountaineer Marathon", not only on the Olympus region, but in the whole of Greece, where gradually hill running established. In the first years the number of participants varied greatly, only through the "outdoor movement" found more Greek athletes to this sport.

In order to arouse international interest, the "Olympus Marathon" event was founded in 2003. The first run took place in June 2004 with the help of Litochoro Municipality and the Litochoro Mountaineering Association. Based on the tradition of the ancient Greeks, who every year, to pay homage to the gods, made a procession from Dion to the peaks of Mount Olympus, the run starts in Dion - the religious center of the Macedonians (motto: running with the gods). 115 athletes participated in the first race, of which 103 were scored. Seven of them were foreigners.

In 2012 the first "Olympus Mythical Trail" was organized. It is an extreme run over about 100 kilometers which is also run at night. Since 2015, the "Lost Trail", a shortened to 57 kilometers run, offered to let the athletes on lesser known paths explore the Olympus during daylight.

There are other runs in the Olympus over shorter distances, in the snow, as well as mixed competitions, such as a biathlon, where the athletes run and bike.

== Organizer E.O.S. Thessaloniki ==
The first organizer of marathons in Greek mountains was the E.O.S. Thessaloniki (Greek Ελληνικός Ορειβατικός Σύλλογος Θεσσαλονίκης, Greek mountaineering club Thessaloniki). Since 1986, the marathon (mountaineer marathon of Olympus, Ορειβατικός Μαραθώνιος Ολύμπου) with only one interruption, annually on the first Sunday in September is organized. Patronage of the event has taken over the community Dion Olympou. In 2018, around 300 runners took part in the competition, of which 249 had finished the race in accordance with the regulations.

=== Running track ===
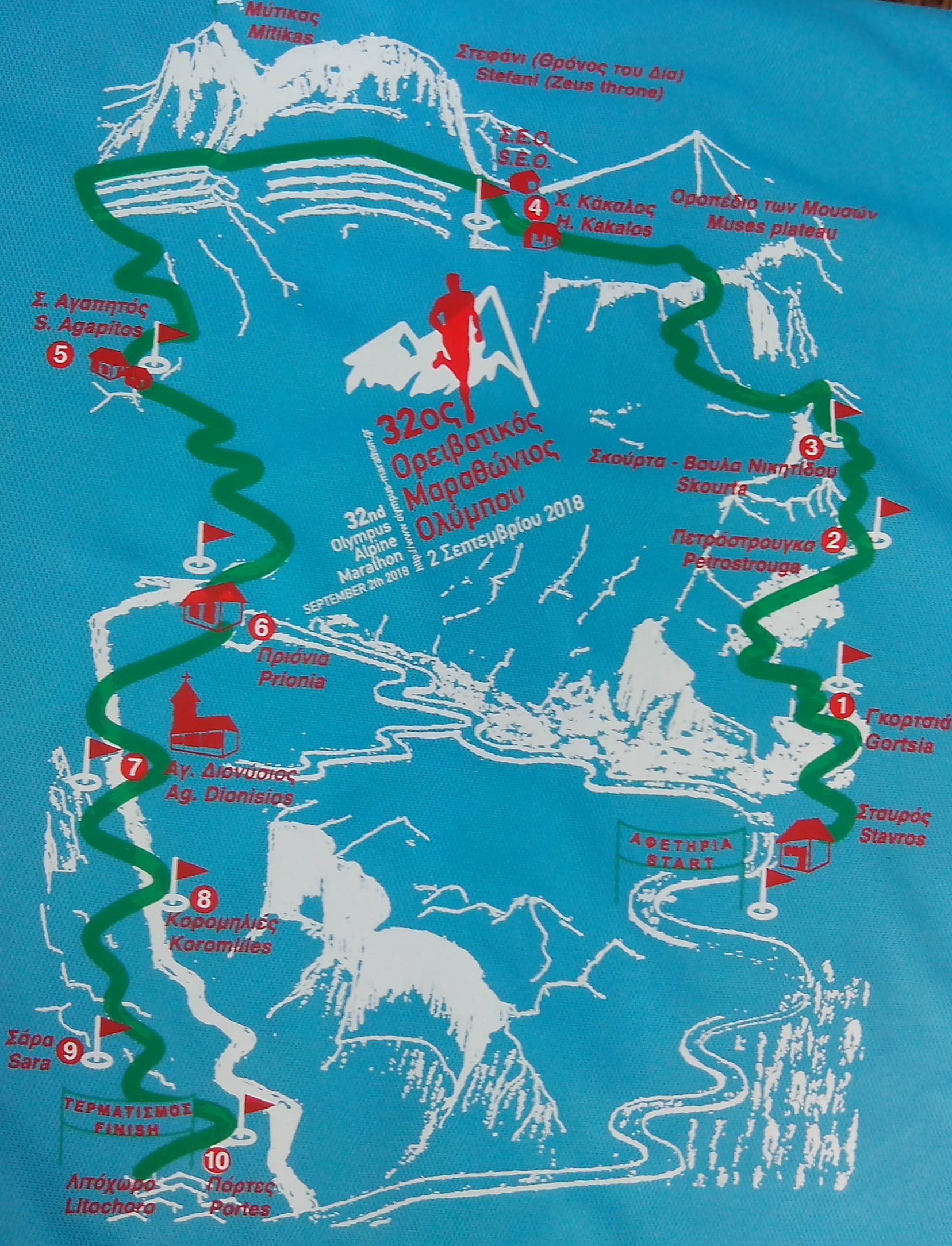
Mountaineer Marathon, running track

- Start at the mountain hut Stavros, altitude 920 m
- 4 km to the junction Gortsia, altitude 1125 m
- 6 km to the refuge Petrostrounga, altitude 1940 m
- 3.2 km to Skourta, altitude 2420 m, also named after the mountain climber Voula Nikitidou, who had a fatal accident in the Olympus.
- 3.1 km to the refuge Christos Kakkalos, altitude 2648 m (named after the first climber of Mytikas, with 2918 m the highest peak of Mount Olympus)
- 5.1 km below and along the summits Mytikas and Stefani to the hut Spilios Agapitos, altitude 2085 m.
- 6.55 km to Prionia, altitude 1100 m
- 3 km to the chapel of Agios Dionysios, altitude 800 m
- 2.35 km to Koromilies, altitude 650 m
- 3 km to Sara, altitude 495 m
- 1.35 km to Portes, altitude 630 m
- 4.15 km to the finish at the central park of Litochoro, near the Nautical Museum, altitude 295 m

The overall length of this running track is about 41.85 kilometers.

== Organizer Olympus Marathon ==
The Olympus Marathon, the Olympus Ultra and the Olympus Vertical take place on the last weekend of June. These events are supported by the Ministry of Economy, Development and Tourism, the prefecture of Pieria and the municipality of Dion-Olympos. In 2018, around 800 runners from 25 countries took part in the competition. The three races, Olympus Marathon, Olympus Ultra and Olympus Vertikal are a part of the Skyrunner World Series.

=== Running track ===
- Start in Dion, altitude 3 m
- 4 km to Agios Konstantinos, altitude 180 m
- 4.5 km to Orlias, altitude 740 m
- 2 km to Koromilia, altitude 1000 m
- 2 km to Bara, altitude 1350 m
- 2.8 km to the refuge Petrostrounga, altitude 1940 m
- 2.4 km to Skourta, altitude 2420 m
- 3.1 km to the Muses Plateau (Oropedio Mouson), altitude ca. 2600 m
- 4.2 km to the hut Spilios Agapitos, altitude 2085 m
- 6.2 km to Prionia, altitude 1100 m
- 2.9 km to the chapel of Agios Dionysios, altitude 800 m
- 3 km to Kastana
- 3 km to Portes, altitude 630 m
- 3.7 km to Litochoro, altitude 295 m

The total length of the route is 43.8 kilometers.

=== Olympus Ultra ===
The race is over a distance of about 70 kilometers. The start is in Dion, the route also leads across the western, Thessalian, part of Olympus. It will overcome a total of 5200 meters in altitude. The organizer prescribes for this extreme run a certain equipment for the runners:

- Bottle for a liter of liquid
- Mobile phone (emergency numbers: 6982382156, 6932271106 and the European emergency number 112)
- Windbreaker
- Headlamp with a second set of batteries
- emergency blanket

=== Olympus Vertical ===
This run will be started in Prionia (1100 m). The goal is to overcome more than 1000 meters in altitude over a distance of 4.3 kilometers. There are no categories or restrictions for this race, any person over the age of 18 is allowed.

== Organizer Olympus Mythical Trail ==
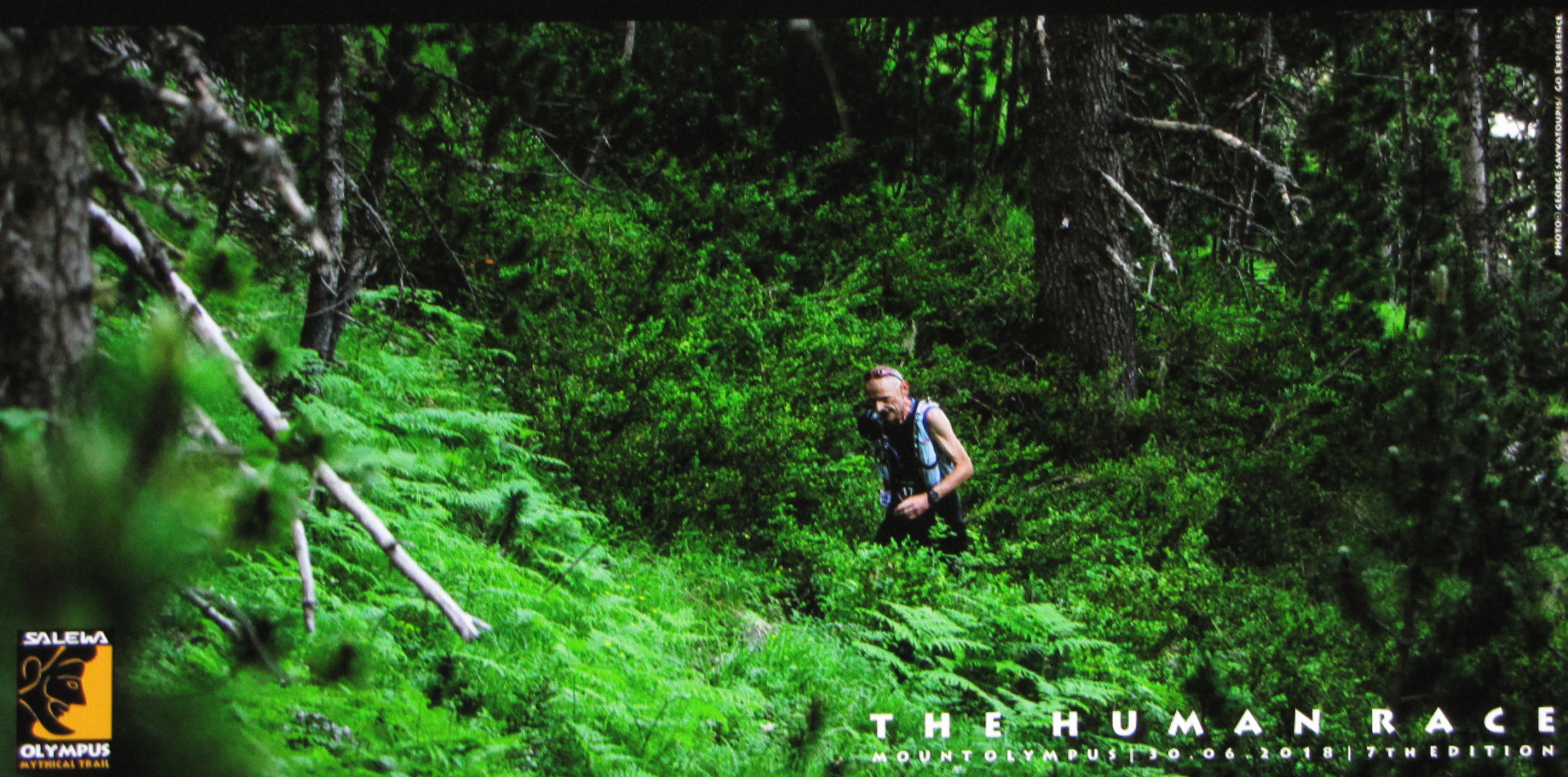
Poster Olympus Mythical Trail

The race takes place annually on the first weekend in July and covers a distance of about 100 kilometers, with 6410 meters of altitude to overcome. Until 2017 it started in the park at the church Agios Joannis, above Litochoro. From 2018, the start and finish were moved to Lakko, on the Enipeas River in Litochoro. The offer is aimed at experienced runners; a medical certificate is not required, but proof of the participant's experience of difficult routes. Greek runners must have completed a number of races within the last three years, foreigners must have completed at least one 80 kilometer run during this period. About 90% of the route is forest trails and mountain trails. This extreme run takes place partly on the Thessalian side of the Olympus and is limited to 28 hours. The runners cross the third highest peak of Mount Olympus, the Skolio (2,910 m).

=== Mythical Trail ===
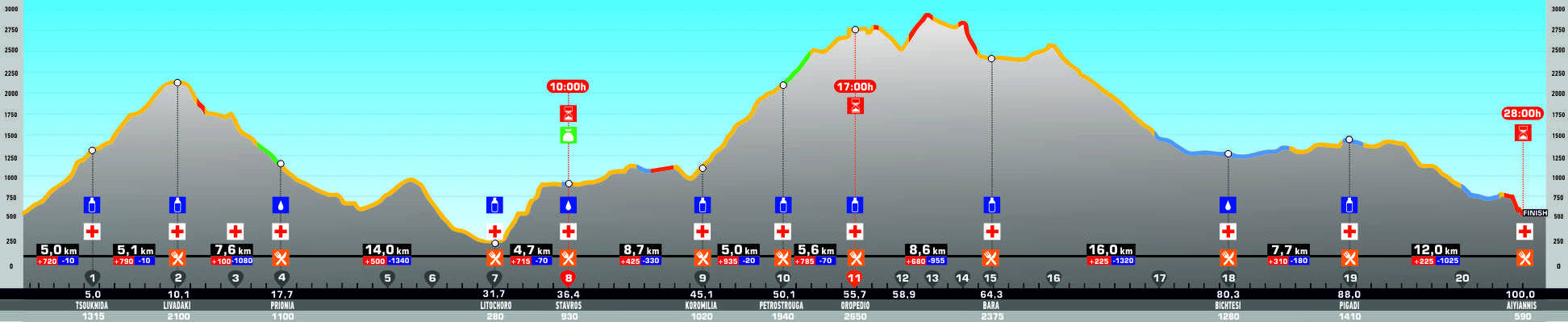
Olympus Mythical Trail running track

==== Running track ====
- Start in Lakko (Enipeas river, Litochoro), altitude 280 m
- 5 km to Tsouknida, altitude 1315 m
- 5.1 km to Livadaki, altitude 2100 m
- 7.6 km to Prionia, altitude 1100 m
- 14 km to Litochoro, altitude 280 m
- 4.7 km to Stavros, altitude 930 m
- 8.7 km to Koromilia, altitude 1020 m
- 5 km to Petrostronga, altitude 1940 m
- 5.6 km to Oropedio, altitude 2650 m
- 8.6 km to Bara, altitude 2375 m
- 16 km to Bichtesi, altitude 1280 m
- 7.7 km to Pigadi, altitude 1410 m
- 11.6 km to Lakko, altitude 280 m

The total length of the track is 99.6 kilometers, at each of the above stations runners are provided with drinks and snacks and medical aid if necessary. A total of 17 checkpoints must be passed. Also for this run a certain equipment is mandatory.

=== Lost Trail ===
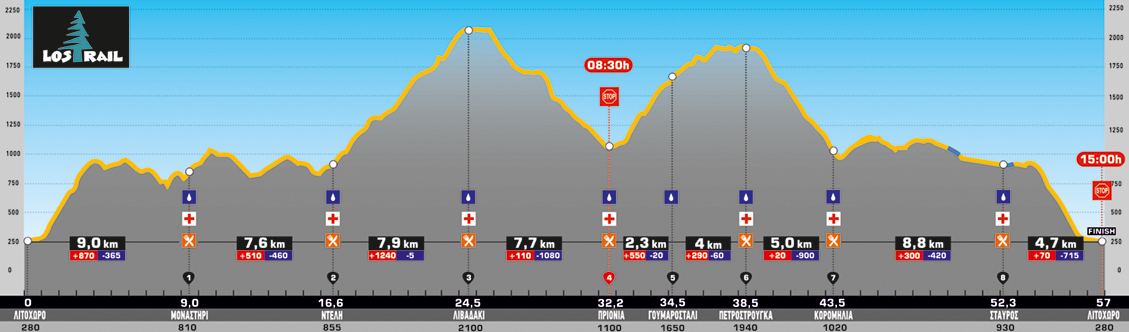
Olympus Lost Trail running track

In September there is a shorter extreme run that has to be done within 15 hours.

- Start in Lakko (Enipeas river, Litochoro), altitude 280 m
- 9 km to Monastiri, altitude 810 m
- 7.6 km to Deli, altitude 850 m
- 7.9 km to Livadaki, altitude 2100 m
- 7.7 km to Prionia, altitude 1100 m
- 2,3 km to Goumarostali, altitude 1685 m
- 4 km to Petrostrounga, altitude 1940 m
- 5 km to Koromilia, altitude 1020 m
- 8.8 km to Stavros, altitude 930 m
- 4.7 km to Lakko, altitude 280 m

The total length of the route is 57 kilometers, at each of the above stations, the runners are supplied with drinks and snacks and medical aid if necessary.

== Organizer Faethon Olympus Marathon ==
The race is organized by Faethon Olympus Marathon and supported by the mountaineering associations of Elassona, Olympiada (Mytikas), Sparmos (Olympus) and Kalyvion (Christakis).

There are three different runs available:

- Faethon Marathon over a distance of about 43 kilometers and 3600 m altitude difference
- Rupicapra semi-marathon over 20 kilometers and 1500 m altitude difference
- Faethon Trail over 14 kilometers and 400 m difference in altitude

Unlike the events mentioned above, these runs take place mainly in the Thessalian part of the Olympus. The races are started in Kokkinopilos, the runners are required to carry a certain equipment. Runners starting at the age of 20 years are entitled to start and the runs are divided into different categories. The organizer does not require a certificate of health status of the athletes.

=== Running track Faethon Olympus Marathon ===
- Start in Kokkinopilos, altitude 1250 m
- 2,3 km, Kiosk, altitude 1360 m
- 4,2 km, Smeos, altitude 2060 m
- 3,7 km, Chotsas, altitude 2520 m
- 3,4 km, Katafigio Anangis, altitude 2350 m
- 6,2 km, Metamofossi, altitude 2500 m
- 5,7 km, Stavraities, altitude 2450 m
- 2,3 km, Skolio, altitude 2911 m
- 1,2 km, Christakis, altitude 2450 m
- 4,4 km, Kardaras, altitude 2350 m
- 6,5 km, Rhoudi, altitude 1800 m
- 1,5 km, Kokkinopilos, altitude 1250 m

== Organizer Almira-X ==
A triathlon will complement the range of extreme sports activities in the Olympus. It includes the classic three triathlon sports; four kilometers of swimming, 182 kilometers of cycling and around 40 kilometers of running. The group of male and female athletes are divided into five age groups. To be admitted to the race, the organizer requires a medical certificate. Each participant needs a companion with his own escort vehicle. It is expected that the athletes will manage the triathlon with a minimum of support. So there are only two stations where the runners are supplied for the 40 kilometer run.

=== Swimming ===
From a boat the competition starts, the swimming ends at the beach of Platamonas. The route depends on the wind direction, the athletes are accompanied by boats.

=== Biking ===
From Platamonas, the Olymp is almost completely rounded. The cycle race takes place on paved roads, 4100 vertical meters have to be overcome. Target is the place Vrisopoules.

=== Running ===
From Vrisopoules, the route leads over the second highest peak of the mountains (Skolio, 2911 m) on forest roads down to the river Orlias, which is the destination of the triathlon. There are 2250 vertical meters to overcome.

== See also ==
- Olympus Marathon
