= Olympus Marathon =

- Date: July
- Location: (Greece) Litóchoron
- Event type: SkyMarathon
- Distance: 44 km / 3,200 m
- Established: 2004
- Website: Olympus Marathon

The Olympus Marathon is an international skyrunning competition held for the first time in 2004. It runs every year in Litóchoron (Greece) in June. The race is valid for the Skyrunner World Series.

== Editions ==
Race of Skyrunner World Series

Year	Men's winner	Time	Women's winner	Time
2004	(Greece) Alexis Gounko	5:27:26	(Greece) Irena Maliborska Kyriakou	7:04:05
2005	(Greece) Nikolaos Kalofyris	5:08:54	(Greece) Irena Maliborska Kyriakou	7:08:42
2006	(Greece) Alexis Gounko	4:56:23	(Greece) Irena Maliborska Kyriakou	6:29:18
2007	(Greece) Alexis Gounko	5:18:43	(Greece) Natalia Papounidou	6:43:14
2008	(Spain) Jessed Hernandez Gispert	4:33:37	(France) Corinne Favre	5:29:57
2009	(Spain) Jessed Hernandez Gispert	4:39:20	(France) Corinne Favre	5:54:41
2010	(France) Sébastien Chaigneau	4:47:34	(France) Lisel Dissler	5:51:33
2010	(France) Sébastien Chaigneau	4:47:34	(France) Lisel Dissler	5:51:33
2011	(France) Michel Rabat	4:35:14	(Russia) Zhanna Vokueva	5:34:04
2012	(France) Michel Rabat	4:55:56	(Russia) Zhanna Vokueva	5:55:52
2013	(Greece) Dimitrios Theodorakakos	4:44:54	(Russia) Zhanna Vokueva	6:13:27
2014	(Greece) Dimitrios Theodorakakos	4:48:07	(Bulgaria) Hristina Kozareva	6:04:04
2015	(Spain) Jessed Hernandez Gispert	4.36.44	(Russia) Zhanna Vokueva	5:57:30
2016	(Greece) Dimitrios Theodorakakos	4:37:21	(United States) Stevie Kremer	5:21:36
2017	(Spain) Egea Aritz	4:24:26	(Netherlands) Ragna Debats	5:18:20

== See also ==
- Skyrunner World Series
- Olympus Marathons
