= Dimitrios Theodorakakos =

Greek long-distance and trail runner (born 1978)

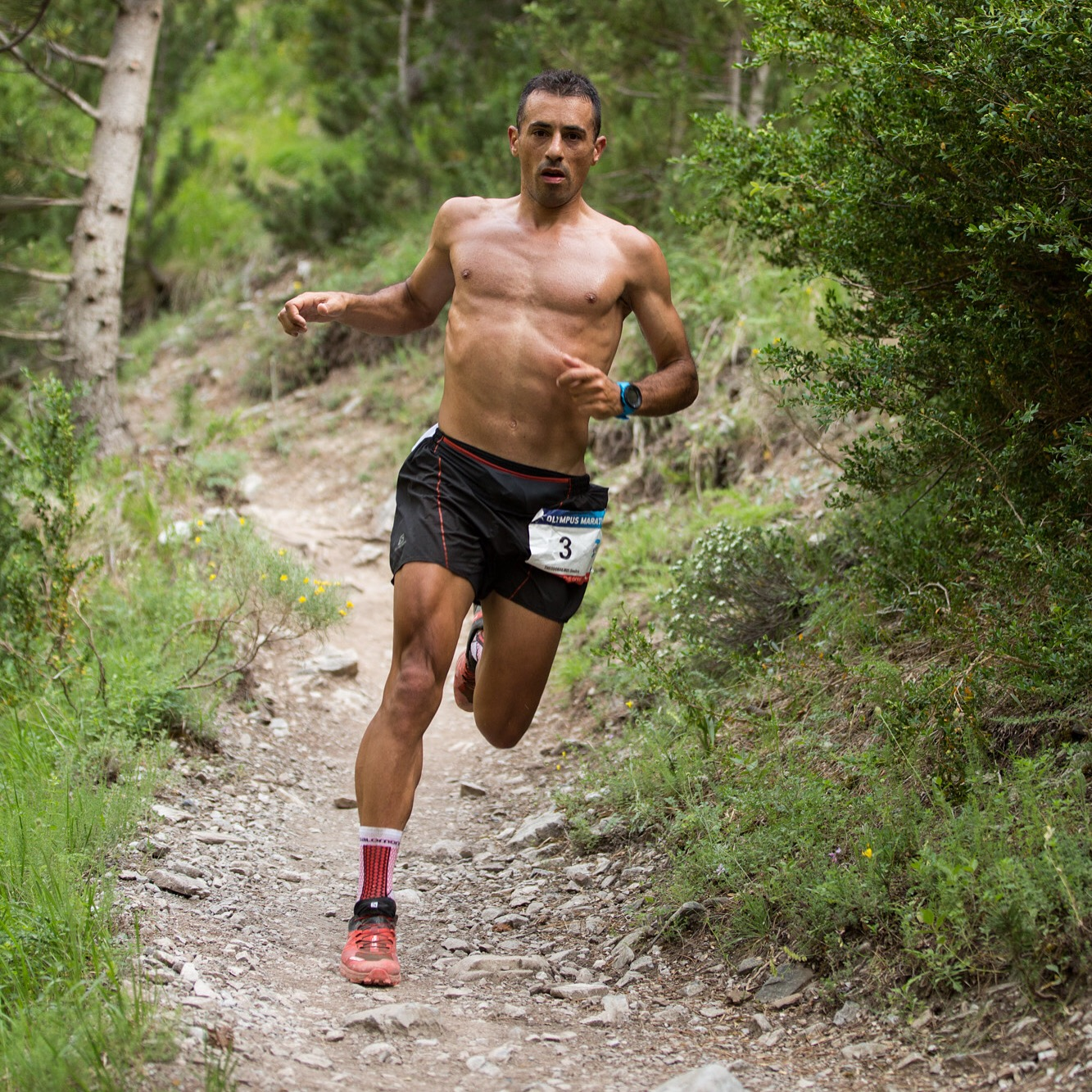

Personal information
- Nationality: Greek
- Born: 5 December 1978 (age 47) Gytheio, Laconia, Greece
- Height: 180 cm (5 ft 11 in)
- Weight: 74 kg (163 lb)

Sport
- Country: Greece
- Sport: Long-distance running, Trail running
- Event(s): 3000 metres, 5000 metres, 10,000 metres, half marathon, marathon
- Club: Panathinaikos

Achievements and titles
- Personal bests: 3000 metres steeplechase: 9:35.19; 5000 metres: 15:09.88; Half Marathon: 1:08:53; Marathon: 2:19:20
- Updated on 15 March 2017

Dimitrios Theodorakakos is a Greek long-distance and trail runner. He was born on 5 December 1978 in Gytheio and resides in Athens. Since November 2016 he competes for Panathinaikos.

He is a two-time Greek marathon champion (2009, 2011) and a five-time winner of the Olympus Marathon (2013, 2014, 2016, 2018, 2021).

== Titles, wins and records ==
=== National titles ===
- Greek marathon champion: 2009 and 2011 (Greek championships held within the Athens Classic Marathon).
- Greek mountain running champion: 2009, 2011,2012, 2014, 2017, 2019 .
- SkyRunning Wold Cup : 2016 (2nd, Madeira / Portugal), 2018 (1st Olympus / Greece)

=== Selected wins (Olympus Marathon) ===
Year	Event	Location	Distance	Time	Notes
2013	Olympus Marathon	Litochoro, Greece	44 km	4:44:54	Winner.
2014	Olympus Marathon	Litochoro, Greece	44 km	4:48:07	Winner.
2016	Olympus Marathon	Litochoro, Greece	44 km	4:37:21	Winner.
2018	Olympus Marathon	Litochoro, Greece	44 km	4:37:44	Winner.
2021	Olympus Marathon	Litochoro, Greece	44 km	5:09:25	Winner.

=== Course record ===
- Great Wall Marathon (2013): men’s course record 3:09:18 (shared/tied with Jorge Maravilla and Jonathan Wyatt).

=== Ultra and trail wins (DUV) ===
Date	Event	Distance	Time	Place	Source
31 Oct–1 Nov 2020	Dromos Athanaton	142 km	11:42:22	1st	
8 Feb 2020	Atromitos Ultra	50 km	3:12:41	1st	
7 Sep 2013	TransApline Run	270 km	27:19:55	1st	
21 Jul 2018	Zagori Mountain Race – TeRA	80 km	8:33:08	1st	
22 Jul 2017	Zagori Mountain Race – TeRA	80 km	9:18:07	1st	
23 Jul 2016	Zagori Mountain Race – TeRA	80 km	9:24:20	1st	
3 Dec 2016	Ellinikon Cross Country Race	52 km	4:56:21	1st	
9–12 Jul 2014	Salomon 4 Trails Etappenlauf (stage race)	163.6 km (4 stages)	15:32:45	1st overall	
26 Jul 2014	Zagori Mountain Race – TeRA	80 km	9:34:29	1st	
27 Jul 2013	Zagori Mountain Race	50 km	4:41:46	1st	
28 Jul 2012	Zagori Mountain Race	50 km	5:08:34	1st	
7 Oct 2012	Royal Park Ultra	50 km	3:25:19	1st	
