= Center for Literature and Arts, Dion =

Greek association

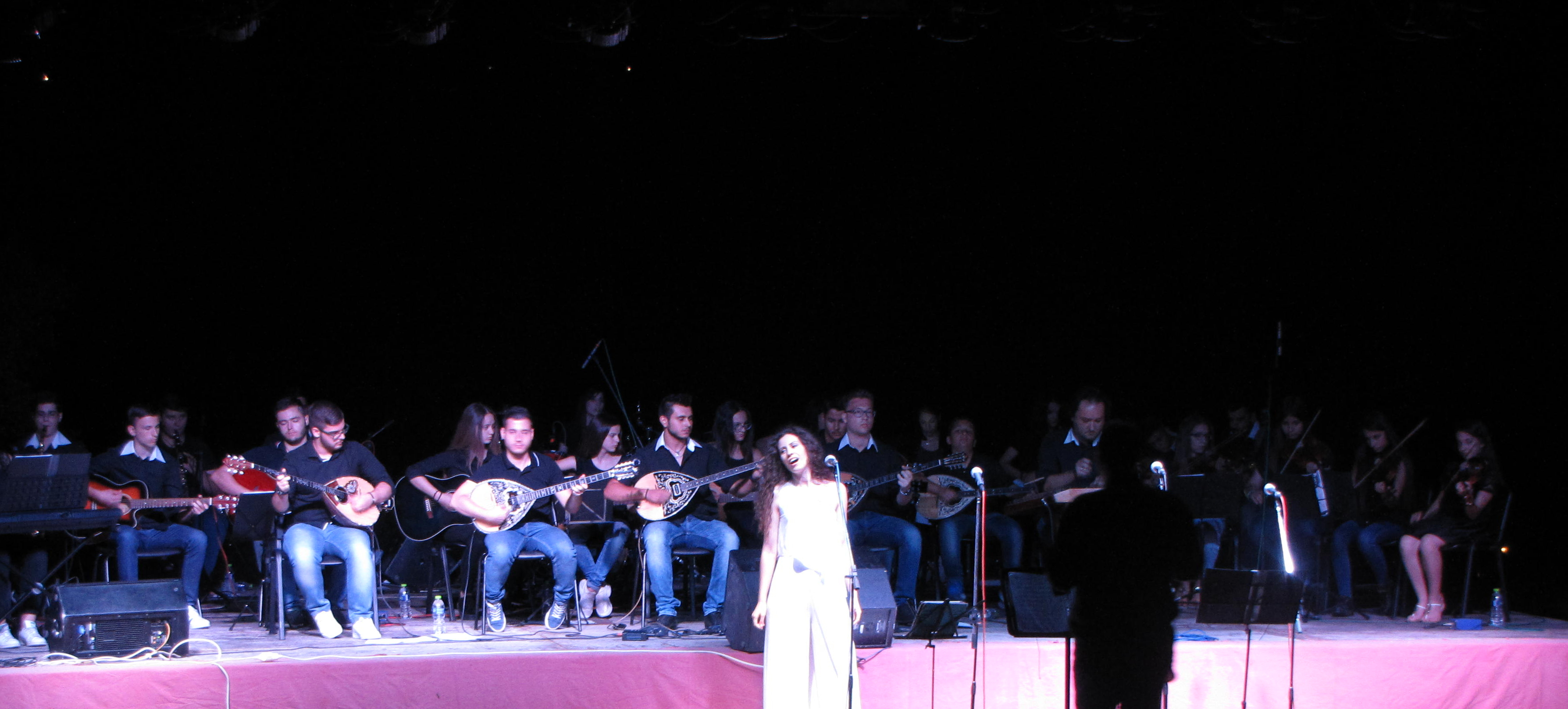
Youth orchestra of Dion

The Center for Literature and Arts (Greek Κέντρο Γραμμάτων και Τεχνών) in Dion is concerned with the promotion of writers, singers, musicians and the passing on of the art of mosaic production. The association is divided into the sections literature, orchestra, choir, polyphonic choir, and mosaic. The main focus is on the youth orchestra Dion.

== The association ==
Seat of the association is in Dion, Central Macedonia, in Greece. The association was founded in 2011 on the initiative of the former mayor of Dion, Grigoris Papachristos. He has about 170 members (as of March 2018), many of whom are artistically active. The board consists of nine members, elections take place every three years. The club is financed by the membership fees and donations, it is occasionally supported by tax revenue.

== Departments ==
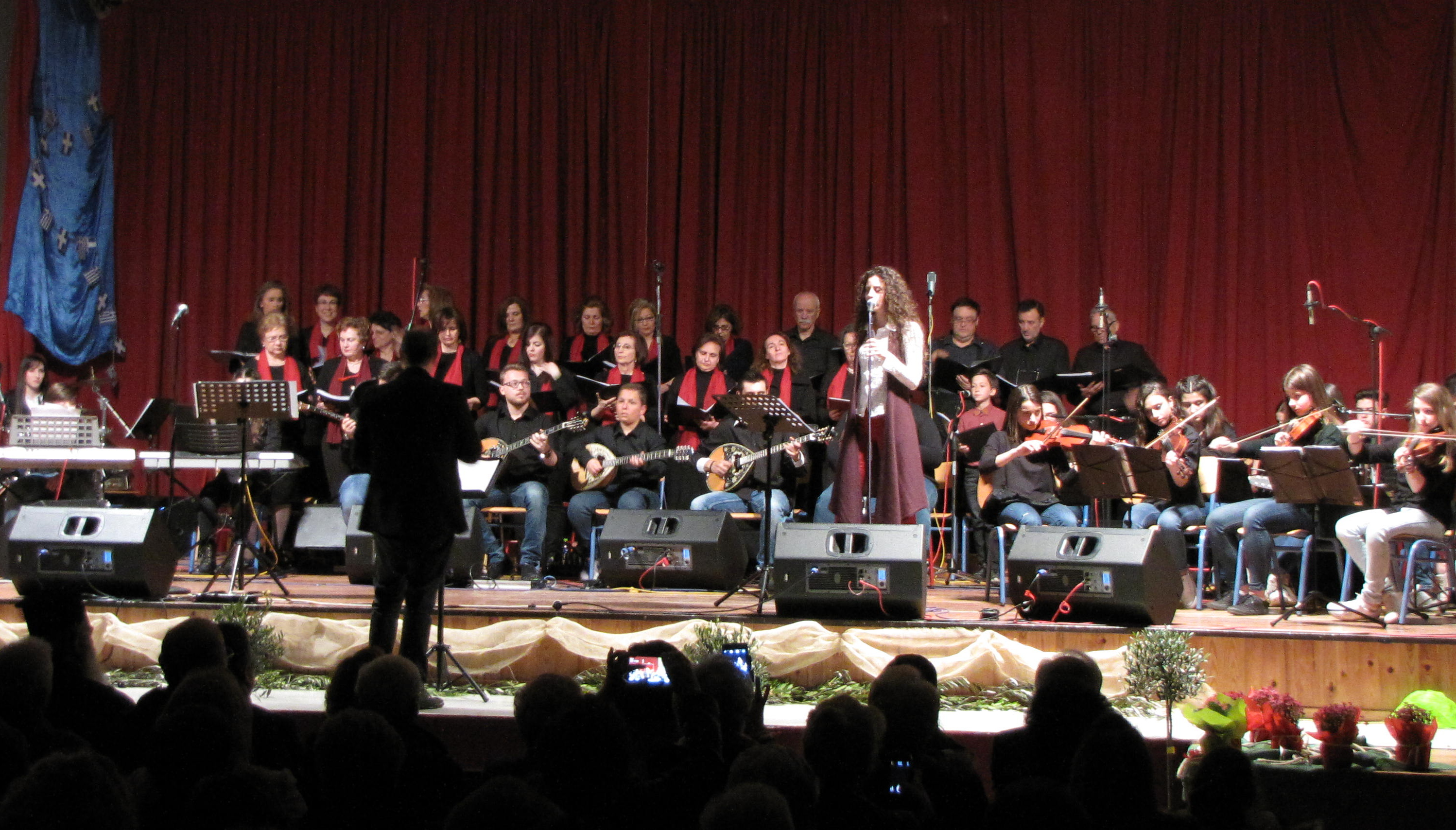
Youth orchestra Dion with choir

=== The youth orchestra ===
The youth orchestra (Ορχήστρα Νέων Δίου) was founded in 2007 and initially supported by the municipality Dion. In 2011, the orchestra was incorporated into the club and represents the society throughout Greece and occasionally abroad. The age of the young musicians is between eight and 25 years; Since its inception, Nikos Patris has directed the destiny of the orchestra. Mainly classical Greek music is performed. The instruments used are mainly baglamas, bouzouki, guitar and drums, occasionally singers are accompanied by classical instruments. The instruments are the property of the musicians and are not provided by the association.

Due to studies, military service, education, etc. not all orchestra members live near Dion, some have other music teachers at their place of residence. At concerts of supraregional importance, the musicians meet for this performances; the number of musicians at concerts varies between 25 and 50. The orchestra has accompanied prominent Greek artists musically and performed the works of Greek composers. Some of them are:

- Dimitris Bassis
- Manolis Mitsias
- Nikos Ziogalas
- Glykeria
- Gerasimos Andreatos
- Antonis Remos
- Sophia Papazoglou
- Dionysis Tsousoudes, Bariton
- Hara Kalatzidou, Sopran
- Demis Roussos
- Christos Nikolopoulos
- Mimis Plessas

Important concerts:

- Opera Thessaloniki
- Akropolis museum Athens
- Ephesos, Turkey
- Stuttgart, Germany

=== The choir ===
In the choir of the association about 80 singers perform, with female singers as majority. In addition to the classical choir there is a smaller group that recites polyphonic songs. Here are around 20 people active. Usually, the choir performs together with the youth orchestra.

=== Literature ===
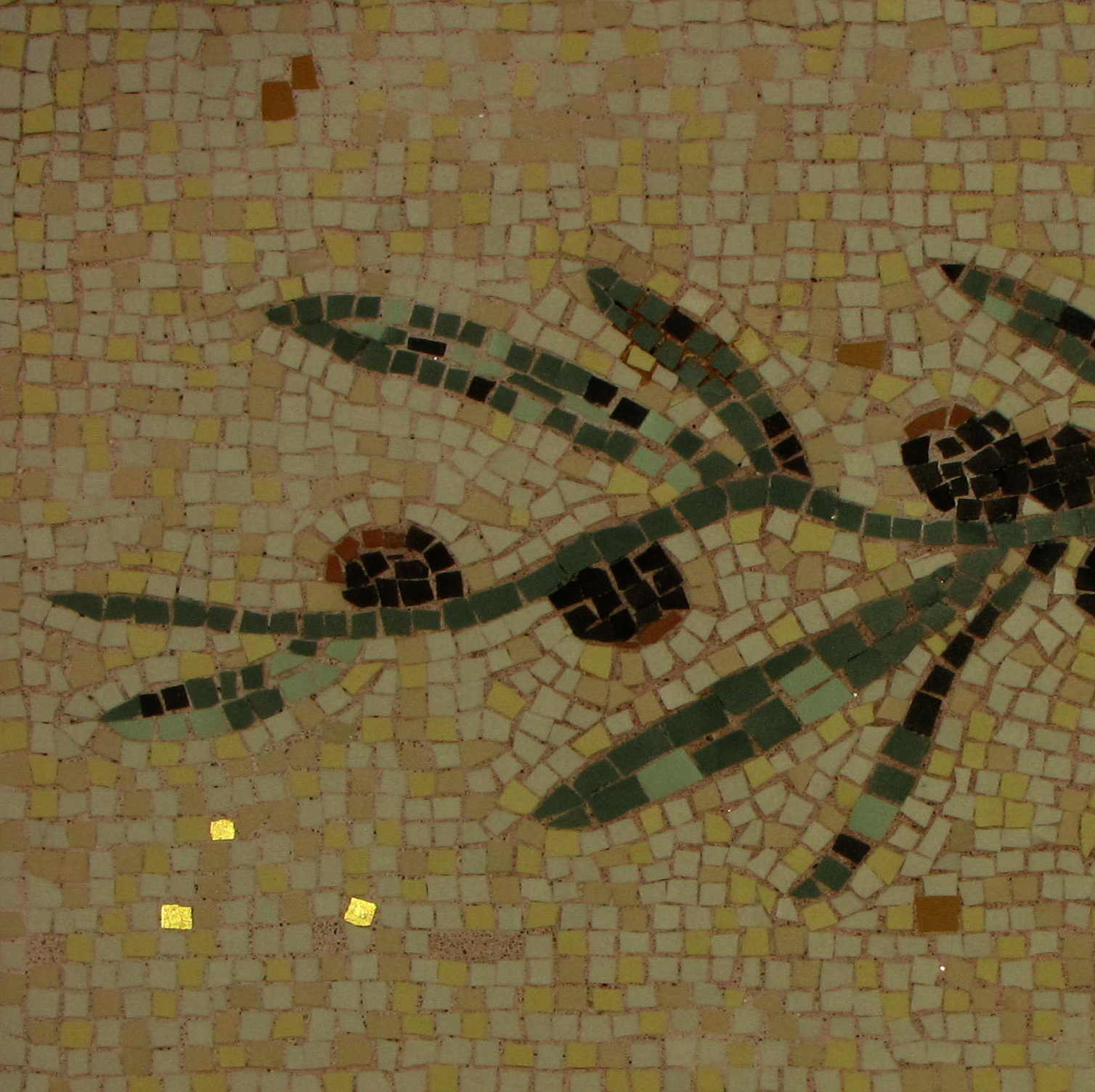
Mosaic, work of a student

Some club members are active writers. The association supports their activities by providing a worthy framework for the publication of their books, establishing contacts with the press and providing the authors with a platform for discussion.

Recent publications:

- Thanos Kosivas - Gramma ston Agios Vassilis apo ton Omran (Γράμμα στον Αη-Βασίλη από τον Ομράν)
- Fani Kountourianou-Manolopoulou - To Travma (Το Τράβμα)

=== Mosaic ===
At the suggestion of Professor Dimitrios Pandermalis, leading archaeologist at the Dion archaeological site, south of the archaeological museum, a building was erected to teach up-and-coming artists the traditional methods of mosaic-making. The project is now managed by the Center for Literature and Arts. During the summer months, there are annual seminars run by experienced mosaic artists.
