= Alexandrion (Litochoro) =

Coordinates: 40.139240°N 22.541842°E

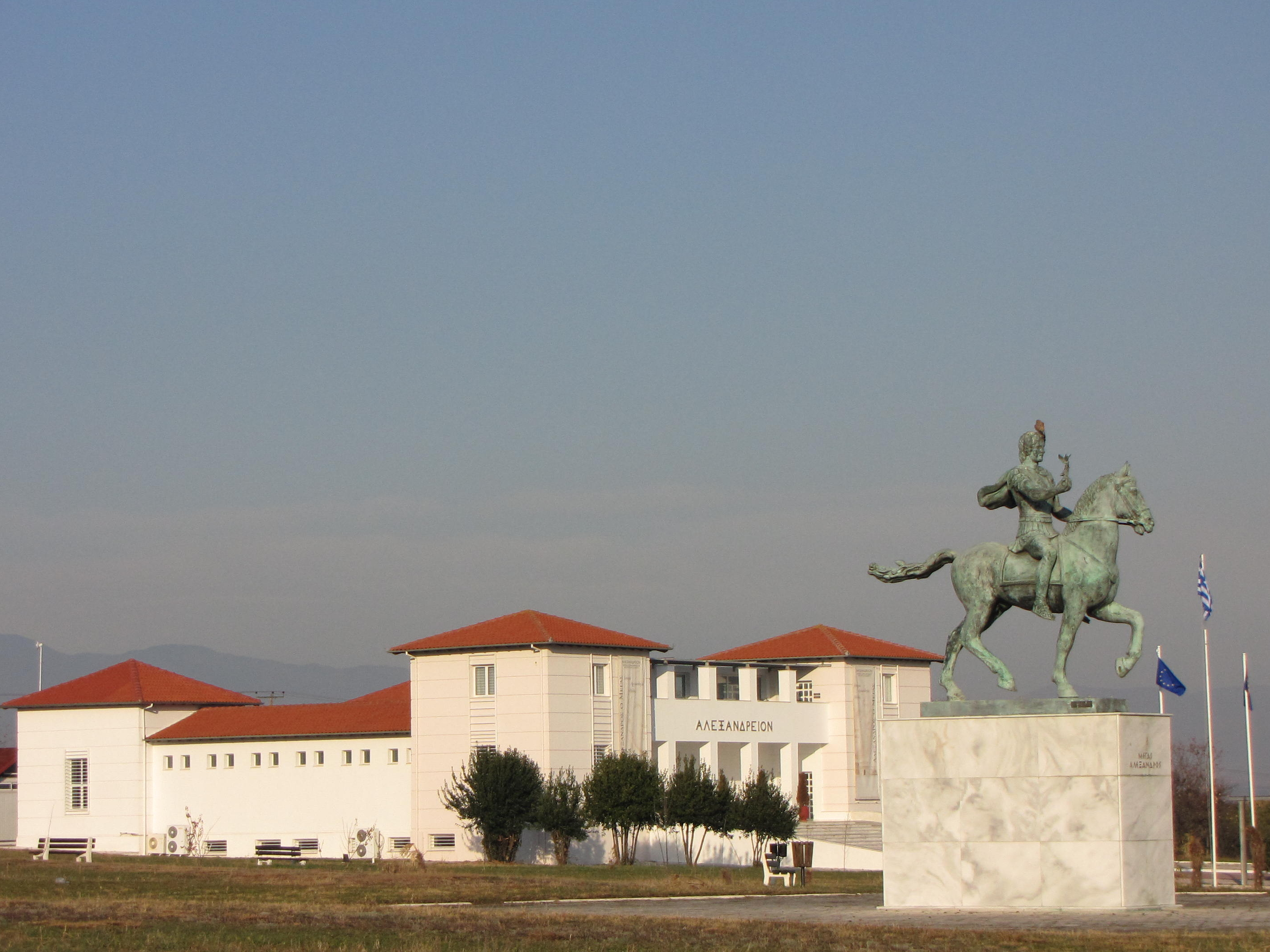
The Alexandrion

The Alexandrion (Greek Αλεξάνδρειον), a building of the international "Alexander the Great Institute", is a private institution of Greek Macedonians living abroad. These Greeks, originating from Macedonia, had the idea to erect a monument in their homeland, at the foot of Mount Olympus, near the Temple of Zeus in Dion, a symbol of their bond with their homeland, and at the same time a place of encounter. It was founded in 1992. The head office of the Institute is in New York City, while the local management is based in Katerini.

== Location ==
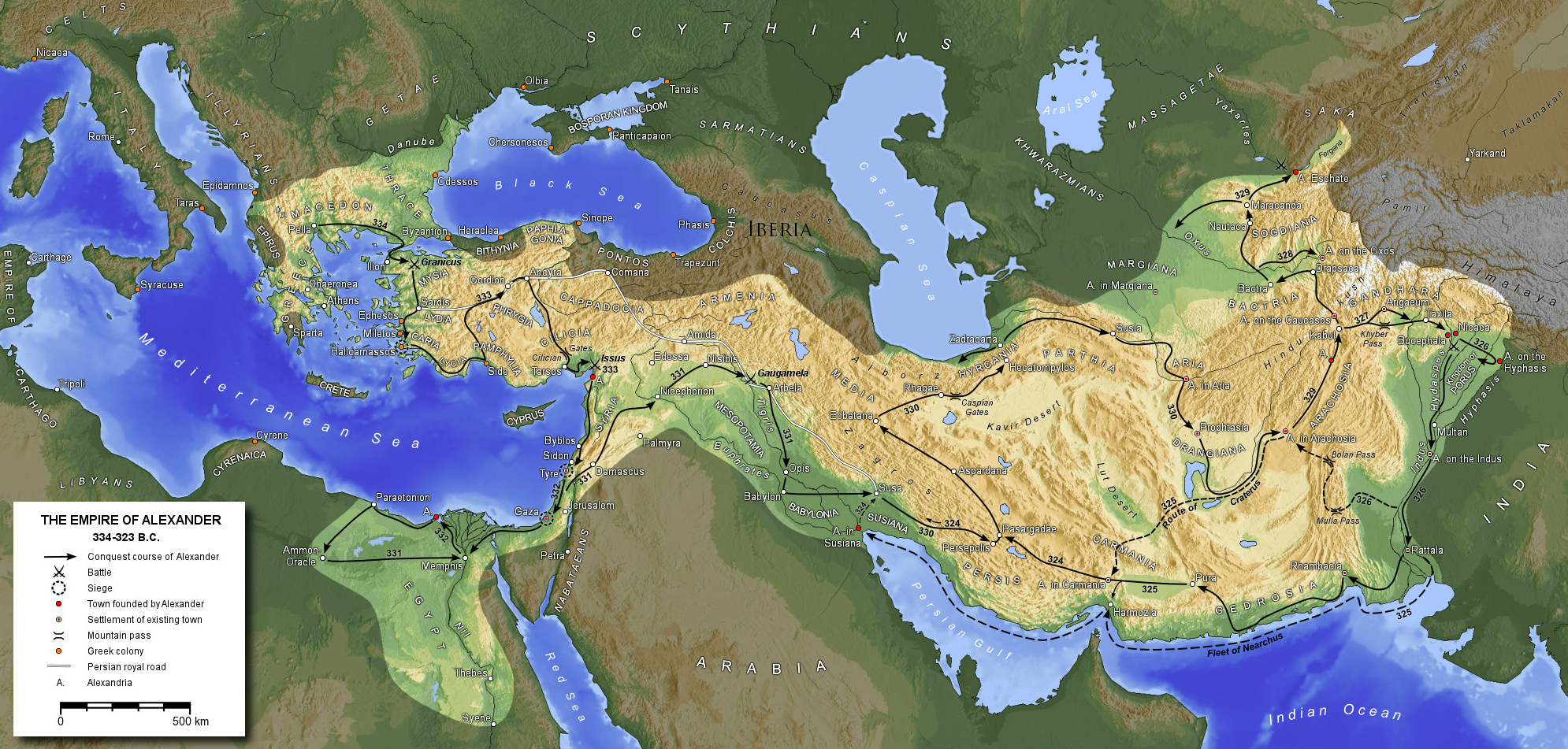
Macedon Empire

The Alexandrion is located just above the A1 motorway (Athens - Thessaloniki), near the Litochoro exit.

== Purpose ==
The institute's goals are beneficial, spiritual, social, artistic and cultural. The preservation and spread of the Greek language and Greek traditions are particularly valuable. Exhibitions and seminars are organized and the Alexandrion serves representative purposes. In addition to former Greek president of the state, Mr. Papoulias, there were other high domestic and foreign personalities hosted as guests. There are concerts, lectures and guided tours.

== The Exhibition ==
All paintings, exhibits and plaques exhibited in the U-shaped building have a relation to Alexander the Great. Beginning with his birthplace Pella, all the stations of his short life are illuminated. The largest chart shows his campaign from Macedonia to India. The individual stages of this campaign are detailed displayed.

Greek and English commentaries of Vergina, Pella and Dion explain Alexander's life in these places. A map showing all the ancient Macedonian places and a copy of the mosaic of the Alexander battles against the Persians. (Alexander mosaic) from Pompei.
