= Olympus National Park Information Center =

Information center in Litochoro, Greece

Coordinates: 40.110036°N 22.499°E

The Olympus National Park Information Center (Greek: Κέντρο Πληροφόρησης Εθνικού Δρυμού Ολύμπου, romanized: Kendro Pliroforisis Ethnikou Drymou Olymbou) is located near Litochoro at the base of Mount Olympus in Greece, and its goal is to inform its visitors about the geology, archaeological sites, mythology, monasteries, plants, animals and other subjects relating to the Olympus National Park.

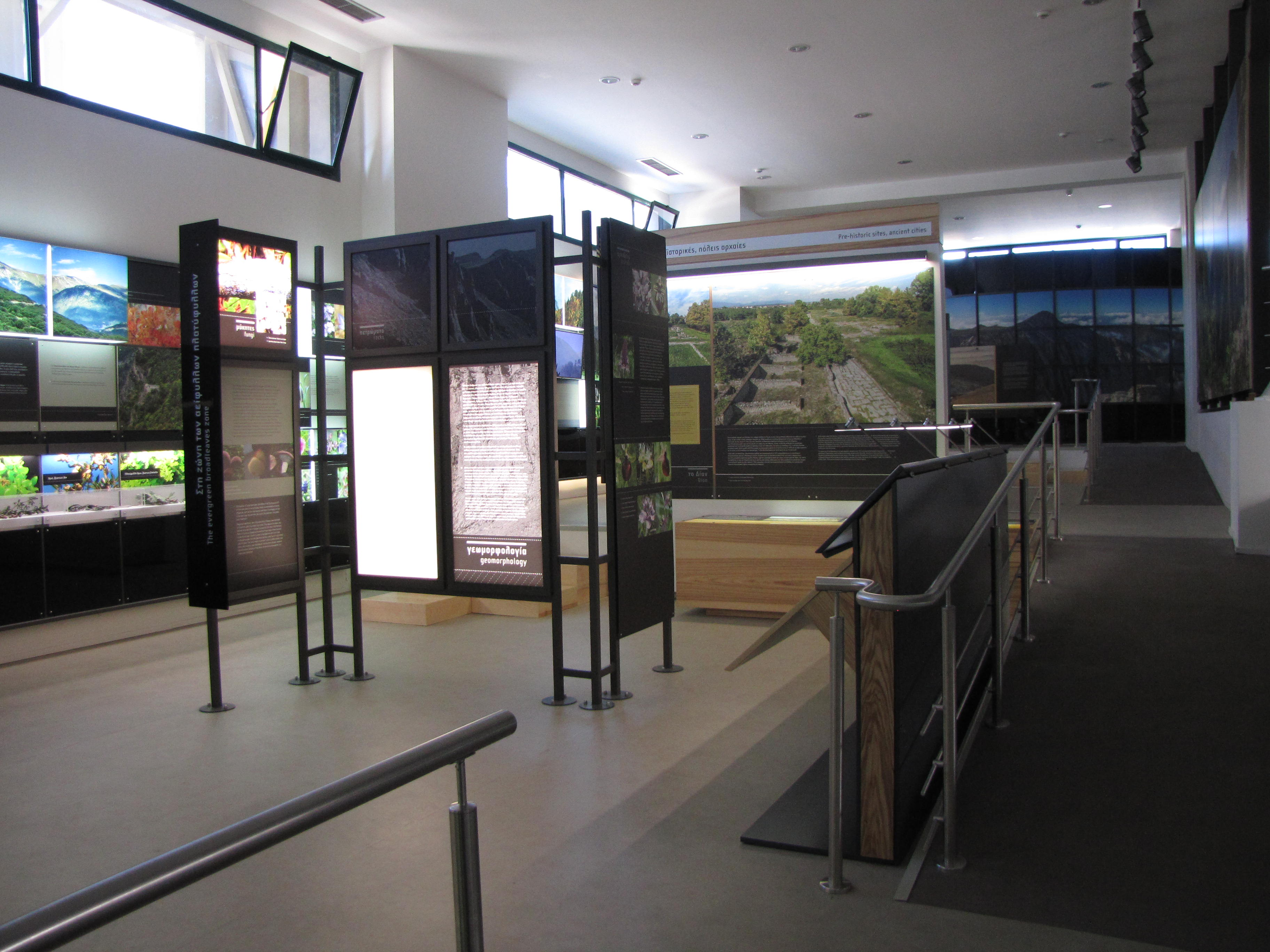
Exhibition at the Olympus National Park Information Center

== Location ==
The centre is located about one kilometer above Litochoro, directly at the road leading to the summits, lies the Olympus National Park Information Center. It is located opposite the extensive sports complex and is signposted.

== Purpose ==
In 1938, Mount Olympus was established as the first national park in Greece, and declared a Biosphere Reserve by UNESCO in 1981.

The building houses the offices of the National Park Administration, the exhibition, a library, various meeting rooms and a spacious atrium for events or exhibitions. There are also rooms for a café and a souvenir shop. The exhibition is the link between the National Park Administration and the public. The visitor is given an overall picture of the mountains. Hiking, nature, archeology, history, fauna, flora, monasteries and, of course, Greek mythology are treated.

== Exhibition ==
The design of the exhibition was designed by the Goulandris Museum of Natural History. The exhibition is divided into seven areas, in which the peculiarities of the seven different zones of the mountain are presented, one will find large-sized boards that provide information about relevant topics in Greek and English. With every rise in the exhibition, the next higher altitude of the mountains is shown and the plant and animal world prevailing there is explained. Places of interest beyond nature are treated on separate boards, information about archaeological sites such as Dion or Leivithra is provided. The hiker is pointed out to interesting places near the hiking trails, such as the monastery of Agios Dionysius or the cave of the painter Ithakisios.

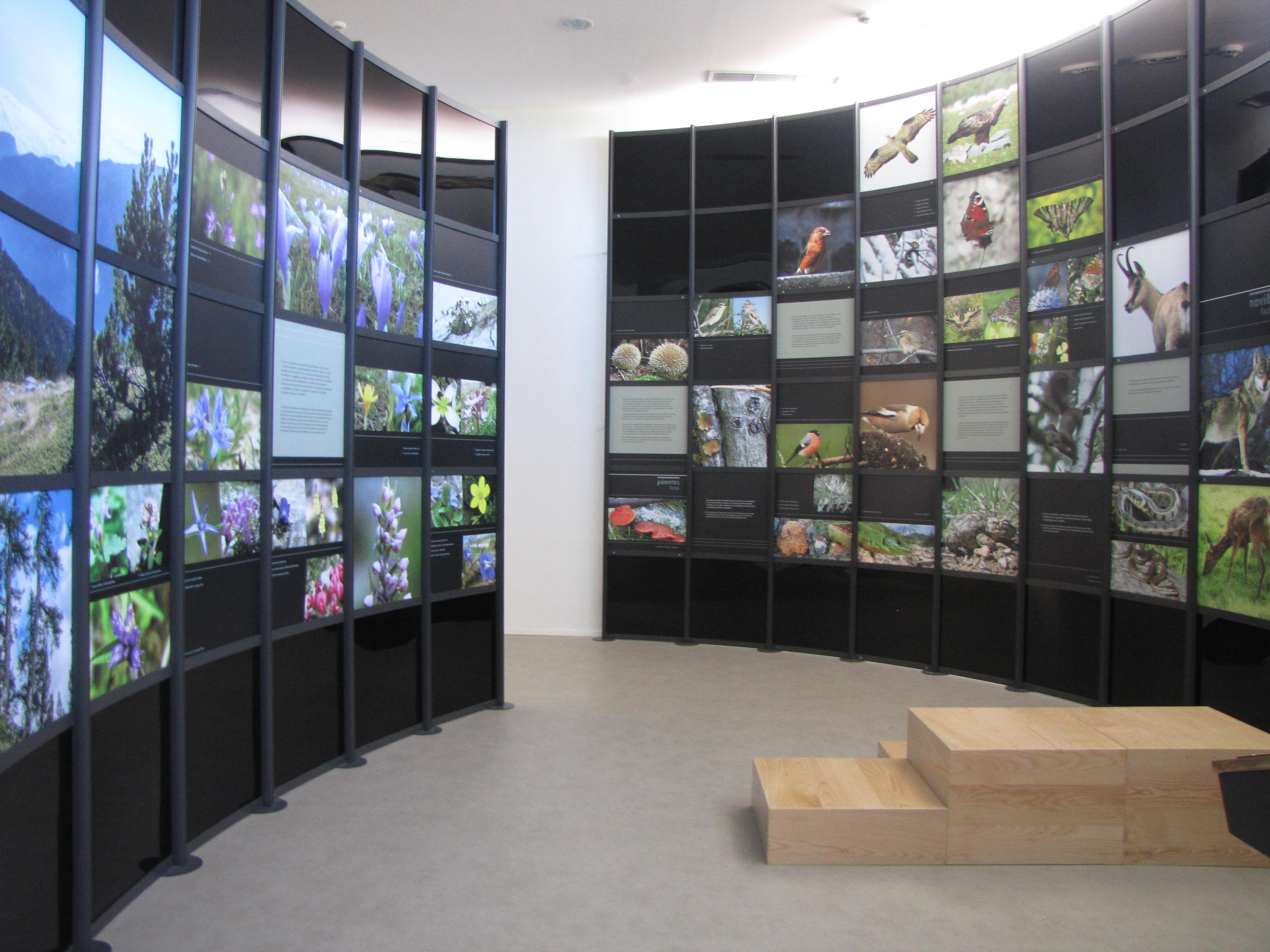
Exhibition at the Olympus National Park Information Center

== Service ==
Multilingual guides are available to assist visitors. A certified Ecoguide is responsible for guided tours in the mountains. The works in the library mainly deal with the themes of Olympus, animals and plants. Most are written in Greek, but books in English, German and French language are also on the shelves. The amphitheater, a room with 142 seats, can be used for congresses, lectures, meetings, etc. A seminar room can also be provided upon request. Registration is required.

The Olympus National Park Information Center is one of the venues of the Olympus Festival.
