= Maritime Museum of Litochoro =

Museum in Litochoro, Greece

Coordinates: 40.105684°N 22.503929°E

The seafaring of the inhabitants of the Greek mountain village Litochoro has a long tradition which is represented in the Maritime Museum (Greek Ναυτικό Μουσείο Λιτοχώρου).

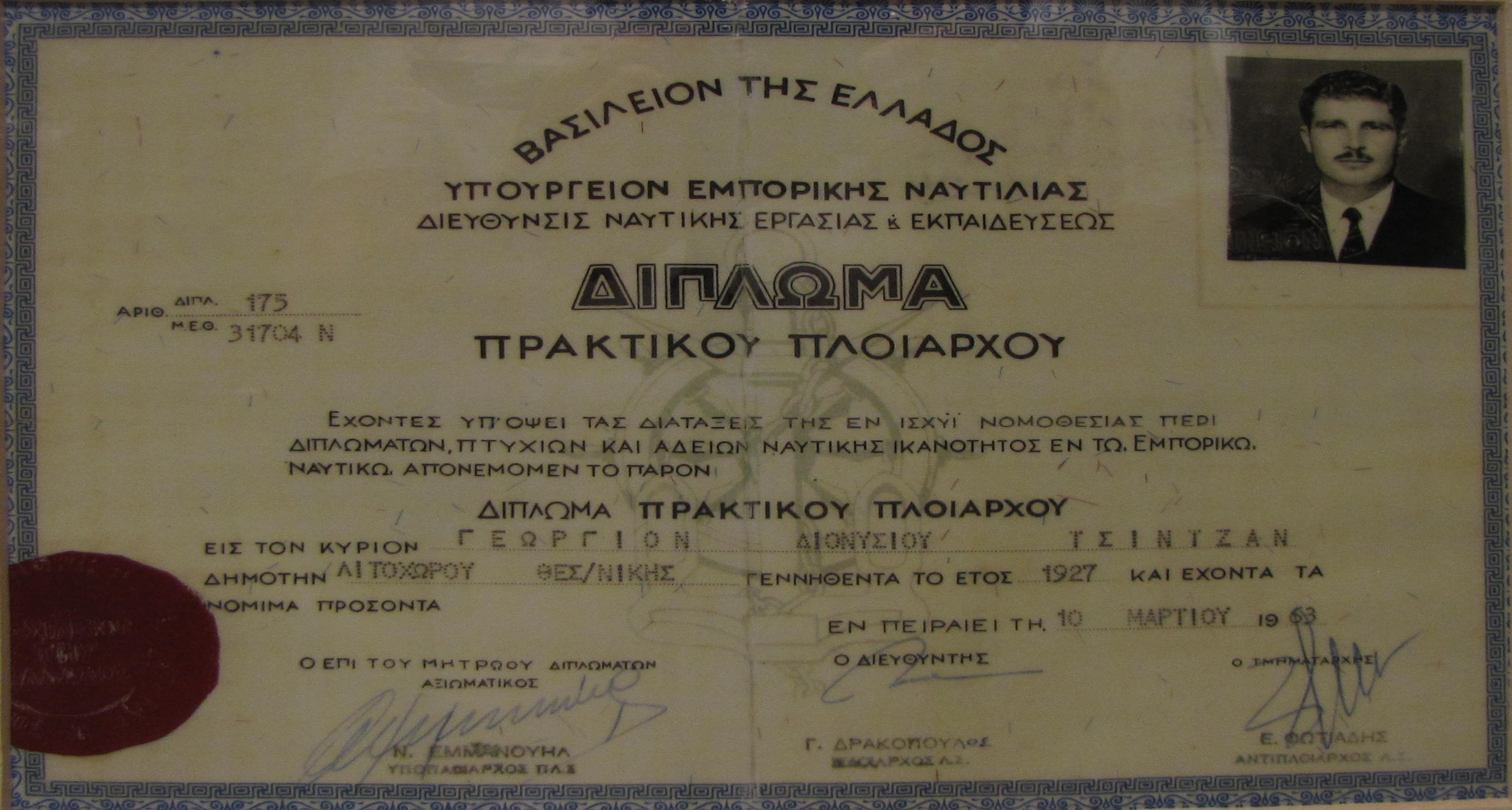
Master's certificate

== Location ==
Litochoro is located on the eastern side of Mount Olympus in Greece, 5 km from the sea and at an altitude of about 350 m. The museum is located in the municipal administration building.

== History ==
Until far into the 20th century, Litochoro was home to many shipowners and sailors. When the steamships displaced the sail ships, this era ended. In 1995 the members of the Association of the Retired Sailors of Litochoro were given the idea of documenting the legacy of maritime navigation and saving and preserving the cultural, maritime heritage of the place.

Between 1995 and 2002 maritime relics were collected within the (formerly) maritime families of the village. From 2002 to 2004 the exhibition pieces were gathered and brought together.

The "Maritime Museum of Litochoro", founded in 2004, is registered in the Greek Ministry of Culture as an "institution of cultural maritime heritage". Since its inception, the scope of the shown exhibits has been constantly expanded.

== The museum ==
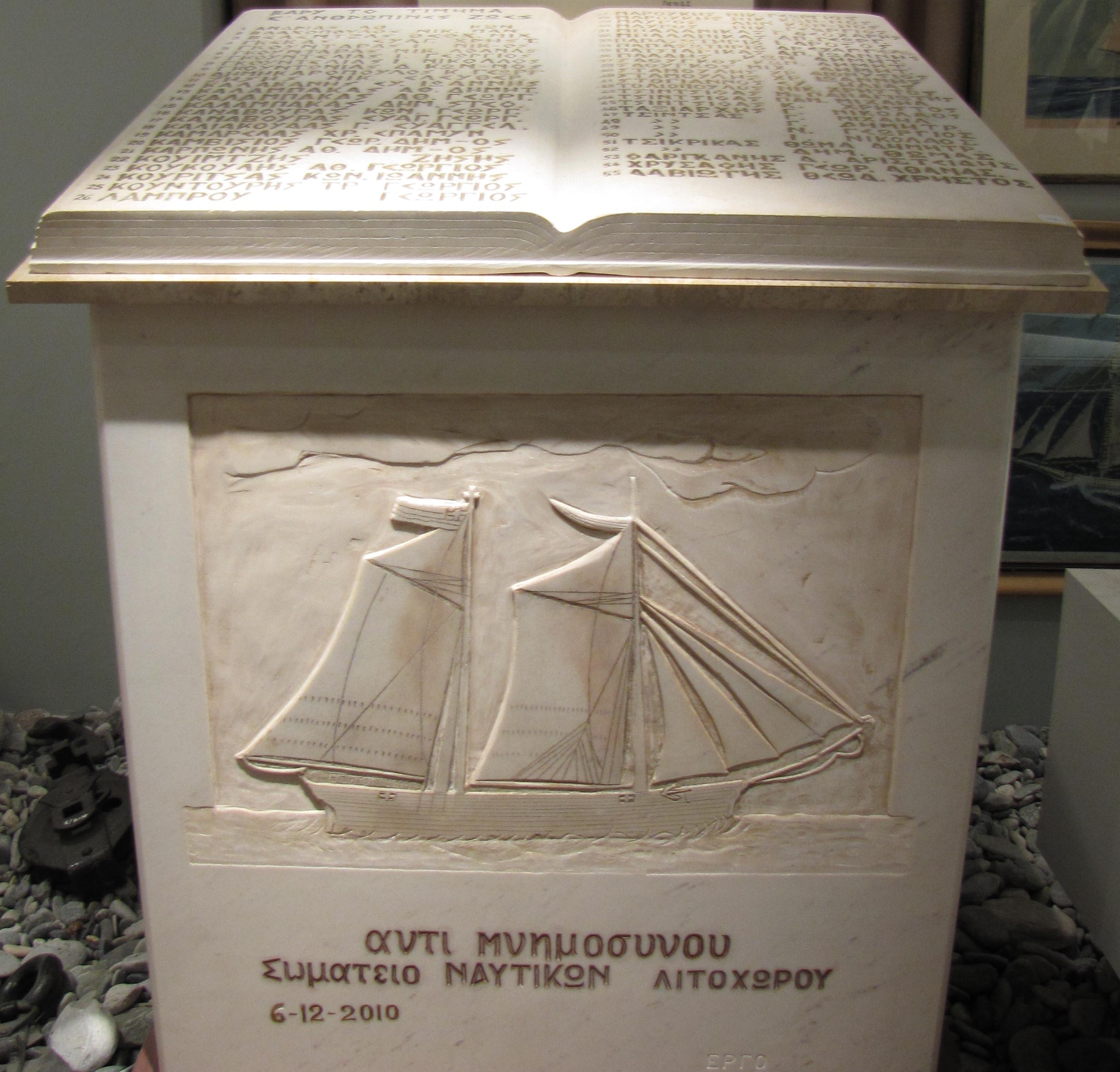
Commemorative plaque in the Maritime Museum

The exhibits are either collected from the households of the former seafarers or were donated by shipowners or the navy. In front of the building are anchors, buoys, ships propellers and a torpedo. Although the museum is dedicated to merchant shipping, the tour begins with a model of a torpedo boat, which, in 1912, sank a Turkish warship in front of the port of Thessaloniki. Old pictures, some almost 100 years old, show proud families in the shipyard who supervise the construction of their ship. Other pictures show sailors on board or in port. In several showcases are impressive ship models. Many of these are original replicas of ships that were once home here. Others represent a cross-section of traditional Greek ships over the centuries.

This is followed by nautical devices such as compasses, chronometers and sextants. Although displaced by modern technology such as GPS, these devices are still mandatory on board. If they fail or do not work correctly, threaten penalties. Furthermore, nautical charts and logarithm tables are needed to determine the exact position of the ship.

The men who have not returned from the sea are devoted to a memorial plaque. It is noticeable that sometimes whole families fell victim to Poseidon's whims.

== The exhibitions ==
In the months of July and August separate exhibitions take place. The themes and the shown exhibits change every year. In 2016 ship models of the model builder Dimitris Maras were shown. In 2017, an exhibition will be held on the history of officer training in Greece.
