= Litochoro =

Town in Macedonia, Greece

Litochoro Λιτόχωρο
- Municipal unit
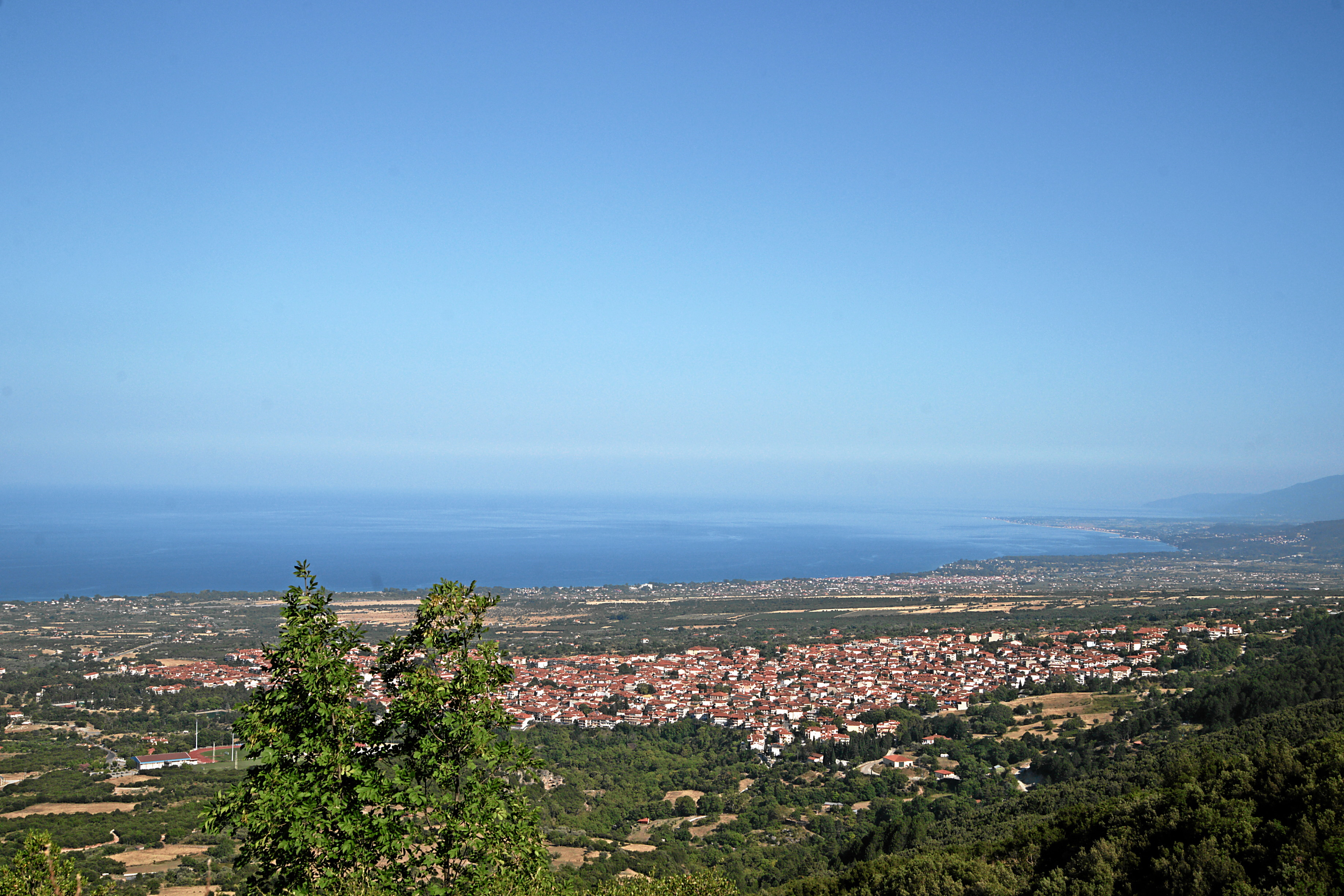
- View from Olympus

- Location within the regional unit

- Location within Greece
- Coordinates: 40°6′N 22°30′E
- Country: Greece
- Geographic region: Macedonia
- Administrative region: Central Macedonia
- Regional unit: Pieria
- Municipality: Dio-Olympos

Area
  - Municipal unit: 169.632 km^{2} (65.495 sq mi)
- Elevation: 293 m (961 ft)

Population (2021)
  - Municipal unit: 6,889
  - Municipal unit density: 40.61/km^{2} (105.2/sq mi)
- Time zone: UTC+2 (EET)
  - Summer (DST): UTC+3 (EEST)
- Postal code: 602 00
- Area code: 23520
- Vehicle registration: KN

Litochoro (Greek: Λιτόχωρο, Litóchoro; Katharevousa: Λιτόχωρον) is a town and a former municipality in the southern part of the Pieria regional unit, Macedonia, Greece. Since the 2011 local government reform it has been part of the Dio-Olympos municipality, of which it is the seat and a municipal unit. It is located at the base of Mount Olympus, on the western shore of the Thermaic Gulf. The first recorded mention of Litochoro is in an account of a visit by Saint Dionysius (Greek: Άγιος Διονύσιος) to Mount Olympus in the 16th century. The town is a popular destination for those wishing to climb Mount Olympus as almost all climbing routes begin to the southwest of the town.

== History ==
On 10 June 1999, 2,200 U.S. Marines and sailors of the 26th Marine Expeditionary Unit landed at Litochoro on their way to Kosovo via the Republic of North Macedonia as part of the KFOR peacekeeping force following the end of the Kosovo War.

== Geographic information ==
Litochoro is located 22 km S of Katerini, 90 km SSW of Thessaloniki, 58 km N of Larissa and 420 km WNW of Athens, on the eastern slopes of Mount Olympus, of mythological fame as the home of the twelve gods of Olympus. Two important ancient sites are located in the neighbourhood of Litochoro. Dion with its large archaeological park and a museum is located about 8 km to the north. Leivithra with its acropolis and the Leivithra Park is about 9 km to the south. The municipal unit has an area of 169.632 km^{2}. Pine, cedar and fir trees of the forests of Mount Olympus lie to the southwest and northwest. Much of the land around Litochoro, in particular to the South, remains uncultivated. Farmland is predominant to the North. Litochoro has several restaurants and cafeterias.

=== Climate ===
Climate data for Litochoro
Month	Jan	Feb	Mar	Apr	May	Jun	Jul	Aug	Sep	Oct	Nov	Dec	Year
Mean daily maximum °C (°F)	5 (41)	5.9 (42.6)	9.2 (48.6)	12.7 (54.9)	17.3 (63.1)	21.3 (70.3)	23.7 (74.7)	23.8 (74.8)	19.7 (67.5)	15.4 (59.7)	11.1 (52.0)	6.5 (43.7)	14.3 (57.7)
Daily mean °C (°F)	2.2 (36.0)	3 (37)	6 (43)	9.6 (49.3)	14.2 (57.6)	18.4 (65.1)	20.8 (69.4)	20.9 (69.6)	16.8 (62.2)	12.6 (54.7)	8.5 (47.3)	3.9 (39.0)	11.4 (52.5)
Mean daily minimum °C (°F)	−0.5 (31.1)	0.1 (32.2)	2.7 (36.9)	6.2 (43.2)	10.7 (51.3)	14.8 (58.6)	17.3 (63.1)	17.5 (63.5)	13.9 (57.0)	10 (50)	6 (43)	1.4 (34.5)	8.3 (47.0)
Average precipitation mm (inches)	101 (4.0)	96 (3.8)	93 (3.7)	76 (3.0)	82 (3.2)	68 (2.7)	66 (2.6)	55 (2.2)	93 (3.7)	110 (4.3)	122 (4.8)	126 (5.0)	1,088 (42.8)
Source: Climate-data.org

== Facilities ==
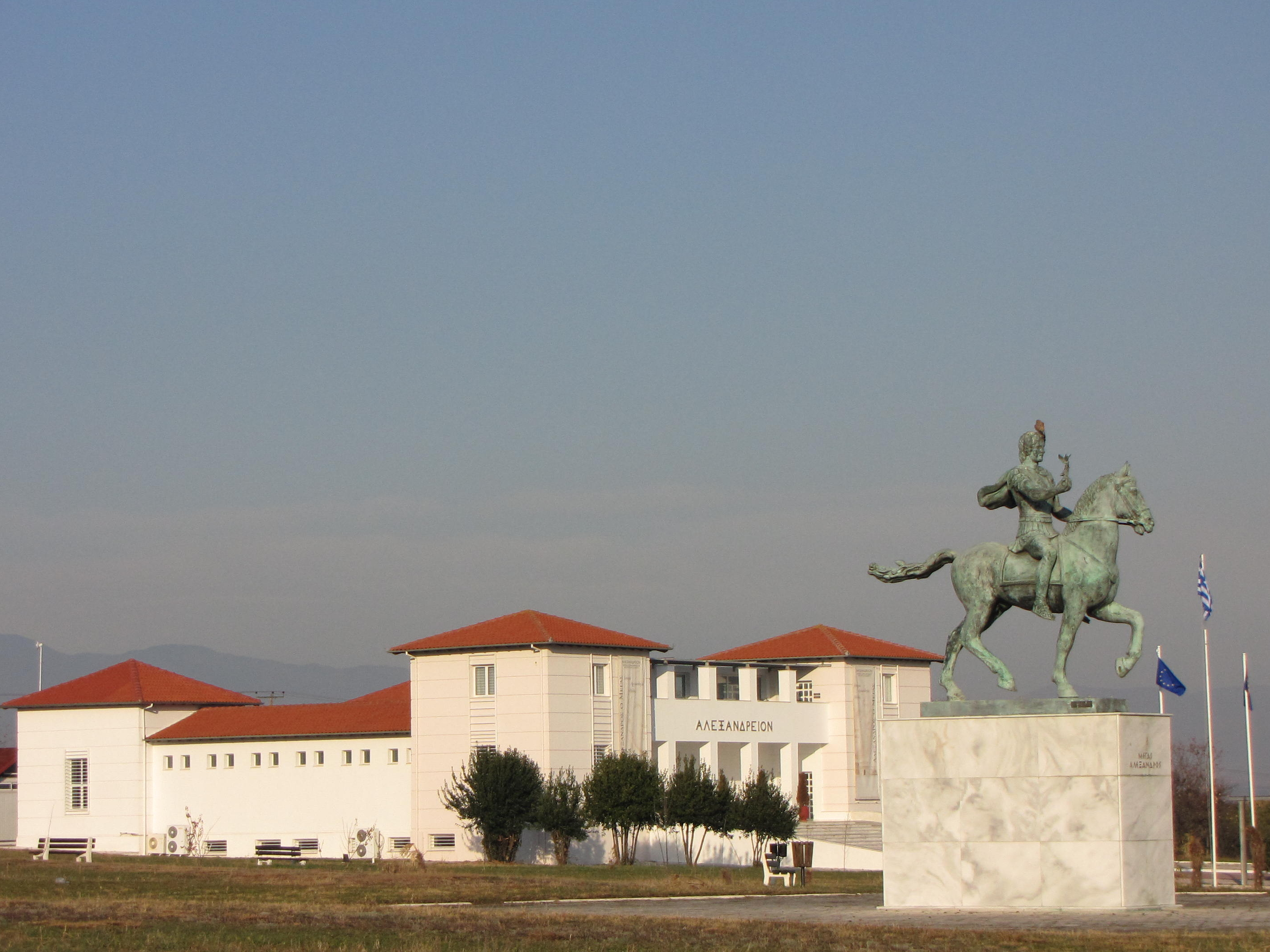
Alexandrion, near the town

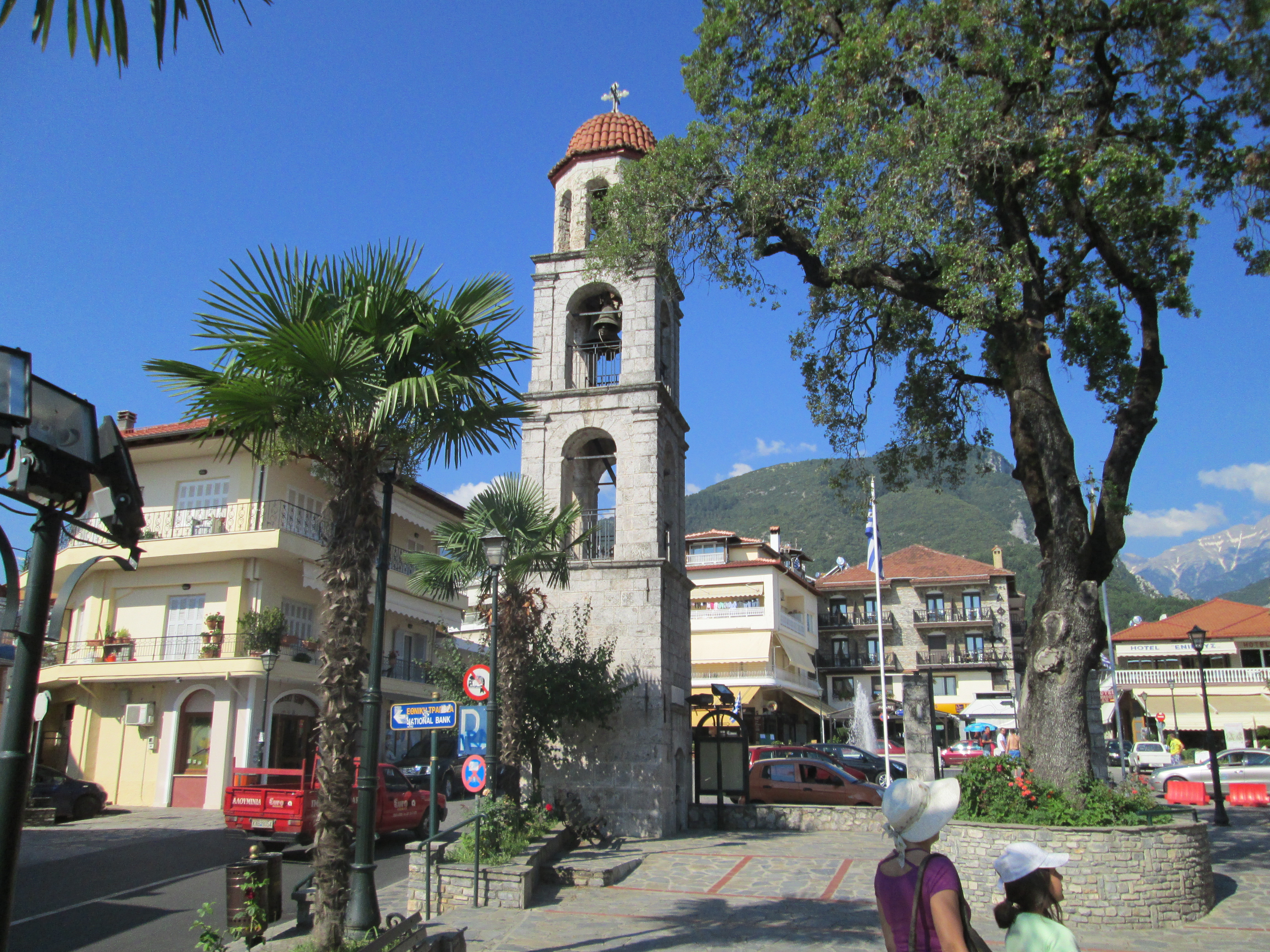
Central square

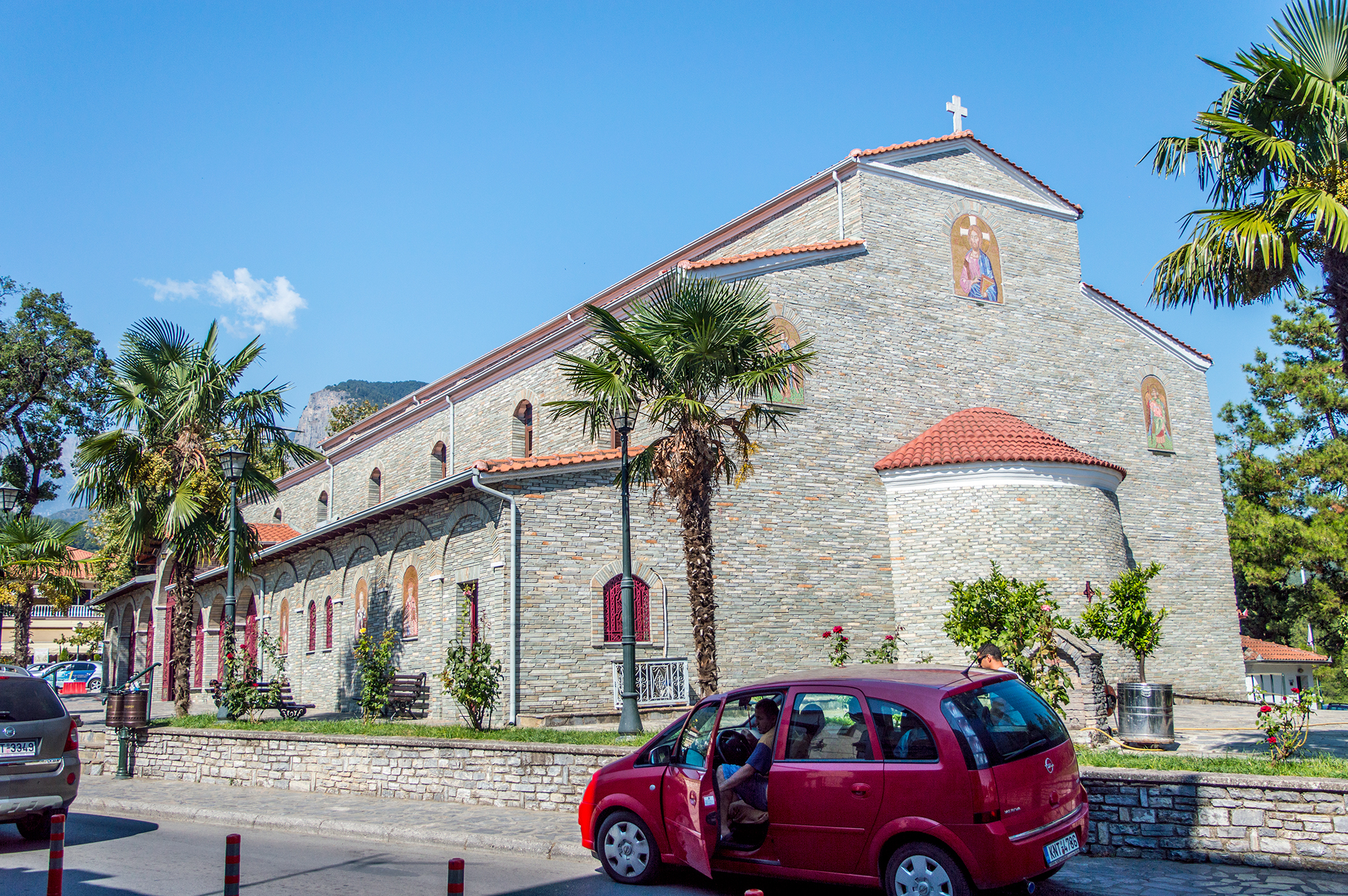
The church of Agios Nikolaos

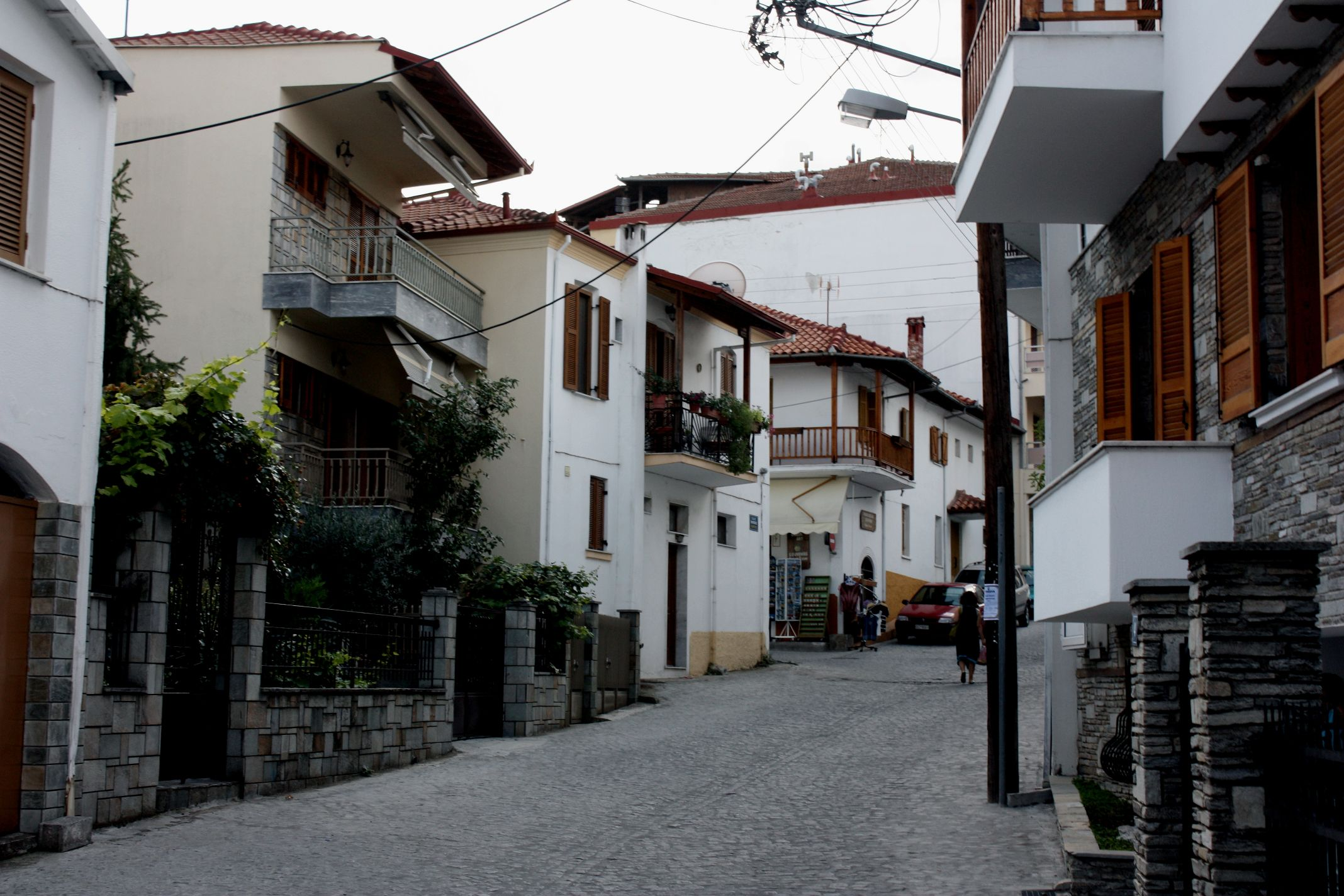
View of a street

Litochoro has schools, banks, a post office, a harbour, a sports centre, a town hall, a hospital, a museum, a concert hall, a gym, shopping facilities and squares. There are two main churches: Agios Nikolaos in the centre and Agios Dimitrios in the North. Litochoro has one of the most traditional cemeteries of Greece, known as Agios Athanasios, in the north of the town.

== Places of interest ==
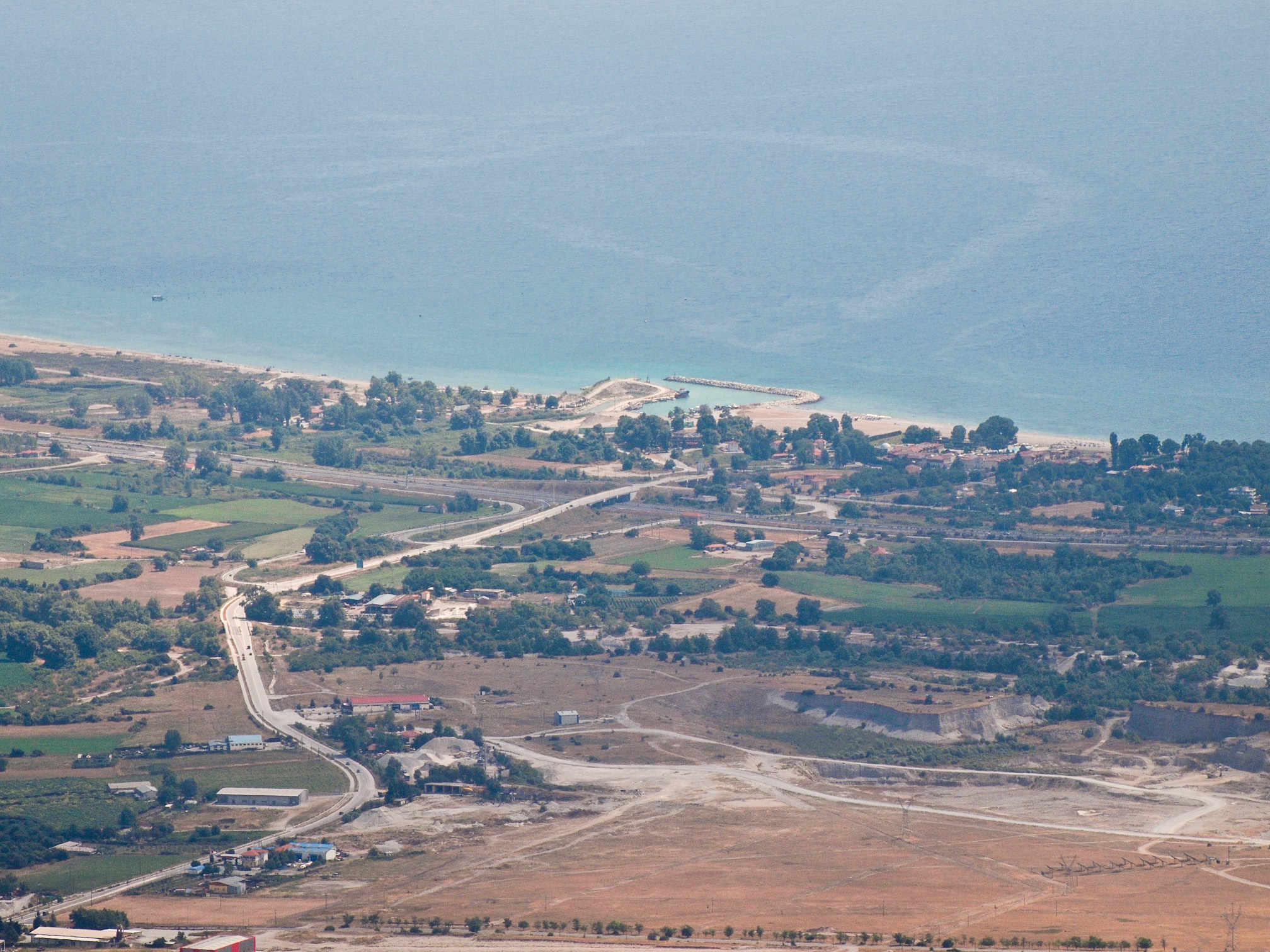
Limenas (port) of Litochoro

Olympus National Park Information Center

Important information is provided here for visitors of Mount Olympus National Park. The Information Center informs their visitors about the geology, archaeological sites, mythology, monasteries, plants, animals and other subjects affecting Mount Olympus.

Alexandrion (Litochoro)

Located beside the A1 motorway (and also the E75), the Alexandreion is an impressive monument-building devoted to Alexander the Great. Visitors will get informed about his life and his military campaign.

The Nautical Museum

At Agios Nikolaou 15, on the first floor, resides the Nautical Museum of Litochoro. Rather unknown, the village has a long maritime history to tell.

The old Monastery Agios Dionysios

At an altitude of 850 m, beside the Enipeas gorge, Saint Dionysios built a monastery. Founded 1542, its name was Agia Triada, what means Holy Trinity, later changed to the name of the Saint. Plundered and burned several times in its history, it received the final blow from German troops in April 1943.

The new Monastery Agios Dionysios

After the old monastery was destroyed, the monks moved to the Metochion three kilometers outside of the village and made the place their new monastery.

== Settlements ==
=== Pláka ===
An extended coastal area known as Pláka or Pláka Litochorou (Πλάκα Λιτοχώρου) is located east of the town of Litochoro, spreading from the foot of Olympus to the Thermaic Gulf and extending from Leptokarya in the south to Gritsa in the north. The E75 highway passes through the area of Plaka to the south of Litochoro. The coast mainly consists of sandy beaches with seaside resorts as well as hotels, campsites, restaurants, and beach bars (which mostly operate during the summer season from June to September). In the area of Plaka there are private residences, luxurious villas, and cottages.

=== Gritsa ===
North-east of Litochoro (North from Pláka) the coastal area continues, known by the name Gritsa or Limenas Litochorou extending from Pláka in the south to the community of Variko in the north. Sandy beaches can be also found here but the tourist facilities are much less than Pláka's. Yet here are some cottages and a luxury hotel (Dion resort). Gritsa is also the port of Litochoro, even though its capacity is restricted.

== Access and transport ==
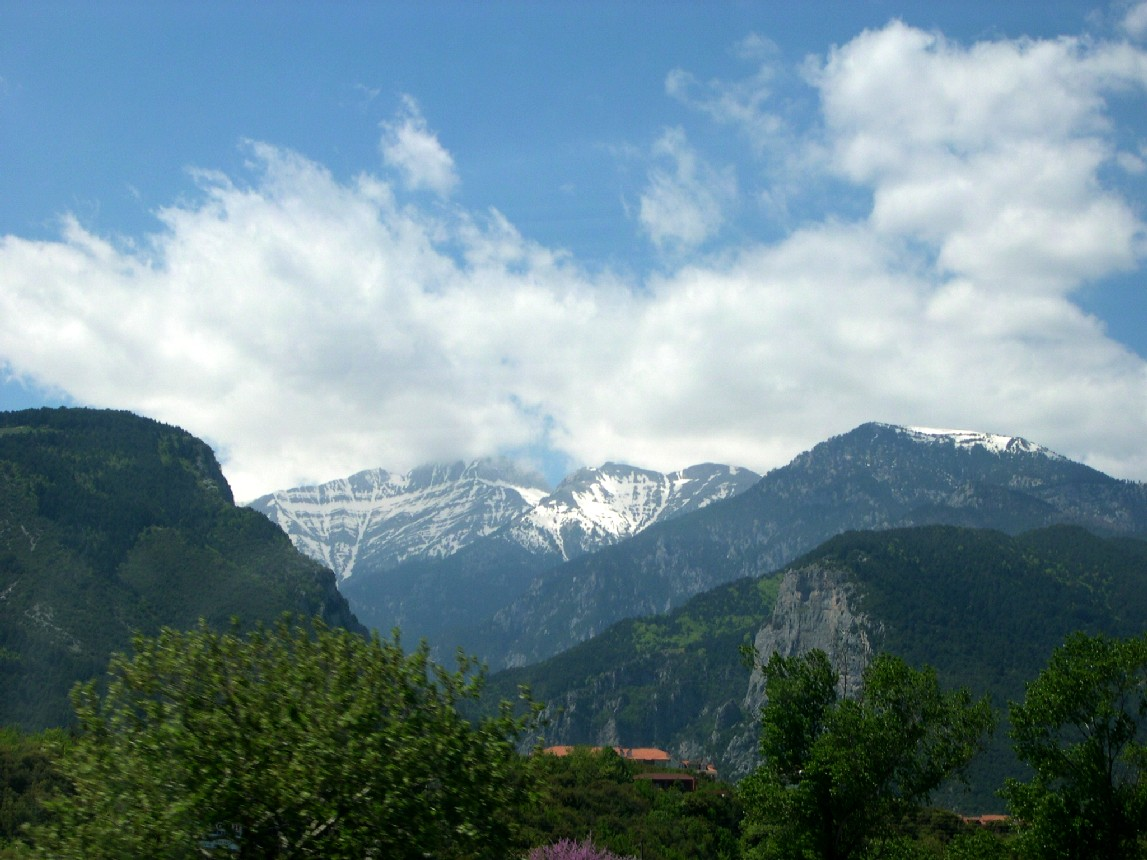
View of the peaks of Mount Olympus from Litochoro

Since the 1960s Litochoro has been served by exits 70A and 71 of the A1 motorway (E75) to the east: in the mid-1990s, parts of the EO1 national road between Athens and Evzonoi were upgraded to motorway standard. Litochoro is on the Northern stretch of this 6 lane dual carriageway, 90 km from Thessaloniki. Its nearest beach is 5 km to the east.

There is a regular bus service to Katerini and a local train service (one train approximately every two hours in each direction) to Thessaloniki and Larissa, where there is an interchange with the main line to Athens. Because Litochoro railway station is about 6 km away from Litochoro and 1 km from the nearest bus stop, people wishing to take the train often take the bus to Katerini and take the train from there. Taxis are to be found in abundance.

- Litochoro acquired some fame during the 1999 NATO war in Yugoslavia when allied naval forces arrived on the beach of Gritsa; an action which provoked a reaction by the town's people that opposed the intervention. The event was broadcast live on CNN International.

== Historical population ==
Year	Town population	Municipal unit
1981	6,157	-
1991	6,667	6,864
2001	6,697	7,011
2011	6,995	7,259
2021	6,615	6,889

== Notable people ==
One of the most famous Litohorians was Christos Kakkalos, who made the first modern unaided ascent of Mount Olympus in 1913.

== See also ==
- List of settlements in the Pieria regional unit
