= Olympiaki Akti =

Village in Pieria, Greece

Olympiaki Akti Ολυμπιακή Ακτή
- Settlement
- Location within Greece
- Coordinates: 40°16′N 22°35′E
- Country: Greece
- Administrative region: Central Macedonia
- Regional unit: Pieria
- Municipality: Katerini
- Municipal unit: Katerini
- Community: Katerini
- Elevation: 4 m (13 ft)

Population (2021)
  - Total: 236
- Time zone: UTC+2 (EET)
  - Summer (DST): UTC+3 (EEST)
- Postal code: 601 50
- Area code: 23510
- Vehicle registration: ΚΝ

Olympiaki Akti (Greek: Ολυμπιακή Ακτή; also known as Olympic Beach and Olympic Coast) is a village in the Katerini municipality, Greece. It is also still domestically known by its initial name Katerinoskala (Κατερινόσκαλα) which can be literally expressed as "Katerini's staircase".

Olympiaki Akti is a tourist destination and seaside resort suburb (settlement) in the Gulf of Thermaic of the Katerini municipality in the east Pieria province, Greece. It is part of the Olympian Riviera and its namesake beach awarded E.U. Blue Flag with entire sand coastline. It is located 7.5 km from Katerini city, 3 km south of Paralia, 70 km from the city of Thessaloniki, 107 km from Thessaloniki International Airport "Makedonia" (IATA: SKG, ICAO: LGTS), 434 km from Athens, northeast of Pierian Mountains and Mount Olympus. The Olympiaki Akti belongs to Olympus Riviera which is both the Mount Olympus and Pieria region coastal area located about 70klm stretching from the southern region of Pieria, Neoi Poroi to Makrygialos settlement on the north. Olympiaki Akti had a population of 236 inhabitants according to the 2021 census. The settlement Olympiaki Akti has been part of the municipality of Katerini since 1981.

A local urban settle bus serving Katerini city from/to Olympiaki Akti. National bus service is from the Katerini long-distance coach bus station of KTEL. Olympiaki Akti is accessible from the A1/E75 motorway (with the Katerini South and North interchanges), and the A2 motorway (Egnatia Odos) to the north. The Olympiaki Akti is 7.1 km from Katerini Railway Station OSE (ΟΣΕ) which is a stop railway station for routes of local trains, Proastiakos train (suburban route Thessaloniki to/from Larissa), main railway route Athens to/from Thessaloniki by regular train and InterCity train. Additionally, you can travel with a special service route to Athens from Thessaloniki new railway station by express electric train named Silver Arrow launched on May 20, 2019 (initially conducted by three trains) having daily the Athens to/from Thessaloniki route lasts four hours including two stops railway station at Lianokladi village of Phthiotis and Larissa city.

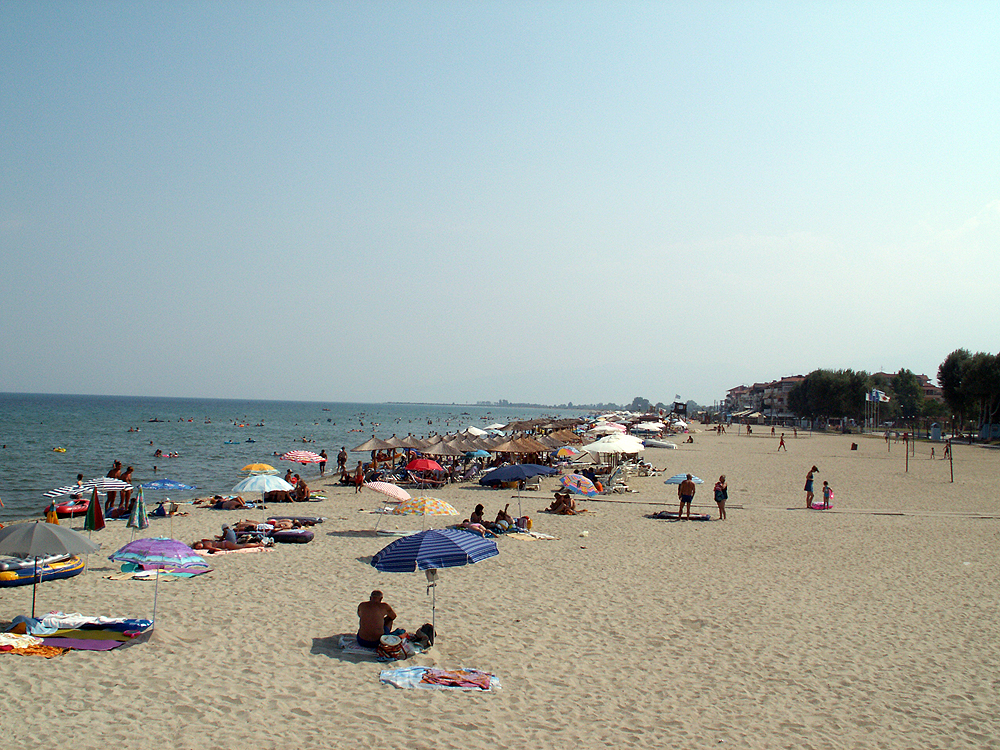
The Beach of Olympiaki Akti

== See also ==
- List of settlements in the Pieria regional unit
