= Peristasis =

Peristasis (Ancient Greek: περίστασις "standing around") may refer to:

- Peristasis (architecture)
- Peristasis, inactive phases of vasoconstriction in inflammation
- Peristasi, Pieria
- The Greek name of Şarköy
