= Moschochori, Pieria =

Village in Central Macedonia, Greece

Moschochori Μοσχοχώρι
- Community
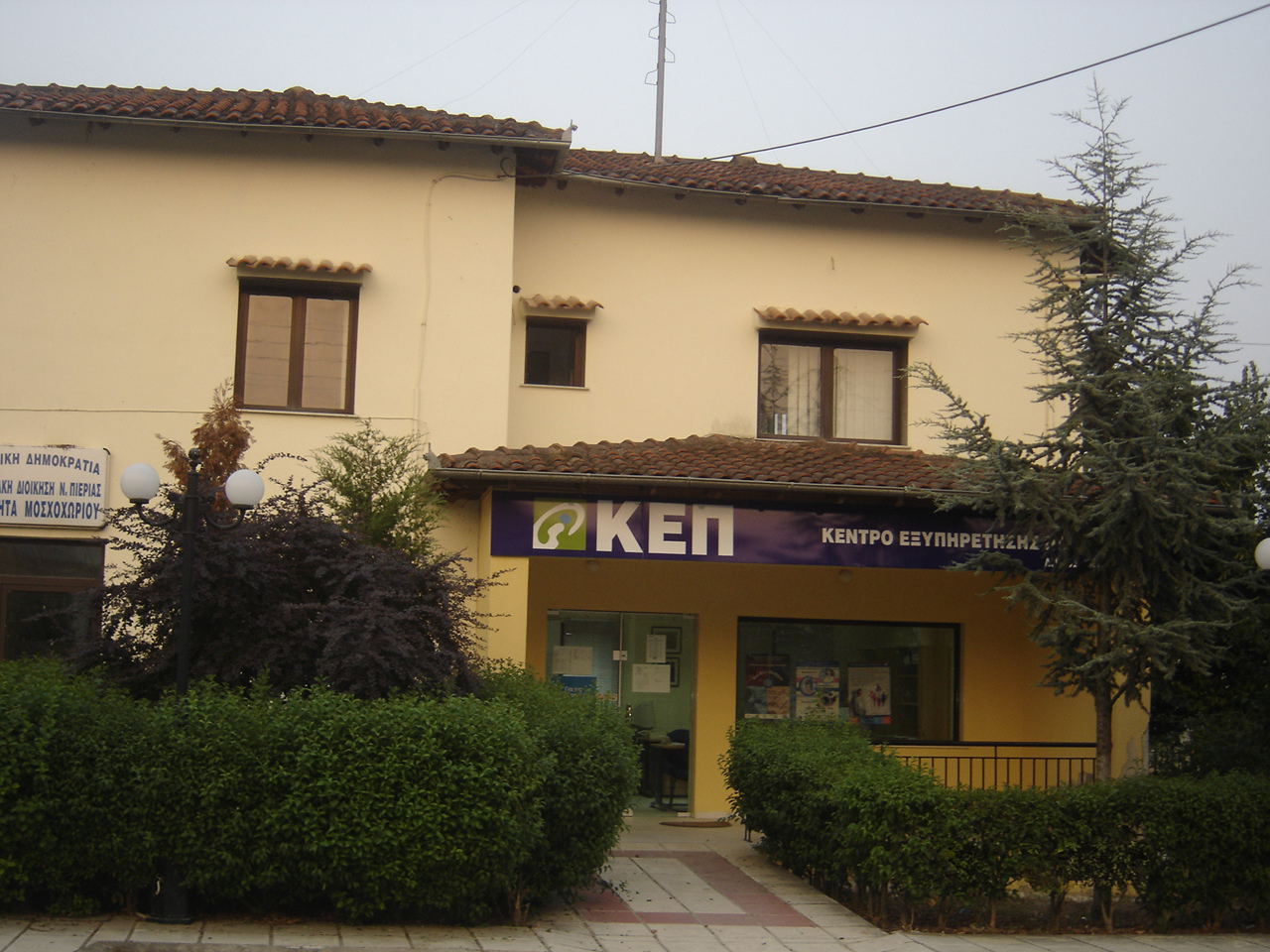
- The community hall of Moschochori

- Location within Greece
- Coordinates: 40°15.5′N 22°23.5′E
- Country: Greece
- Administrative region: Central Macedonia
- Regional unit: Pieria
- Municipality: Katerini
- Municipal unit: Petra
- Elevation: 110 m (360 ft)

Population (2021)
  - Community: 462
- Time zone: UTC+2 (EET)
  - Summer (DST): UTC+3 (EEST)
- Postal code: 601 00
- Area code: 23510
- Vehicle registration: KN

Moschochori (Greek: Μοσχοχώρι) is a village and a community of the Katerini municipality. Before the 2011 local government reform it was part of the municipality of Petra, of which it was a municipal district. The 2021 census recorded 462 inhabitants in the village.
