= Peristasi, Pieria =

Village in Central Macedonia, Greece

Peristasi Περίσταση
- Community
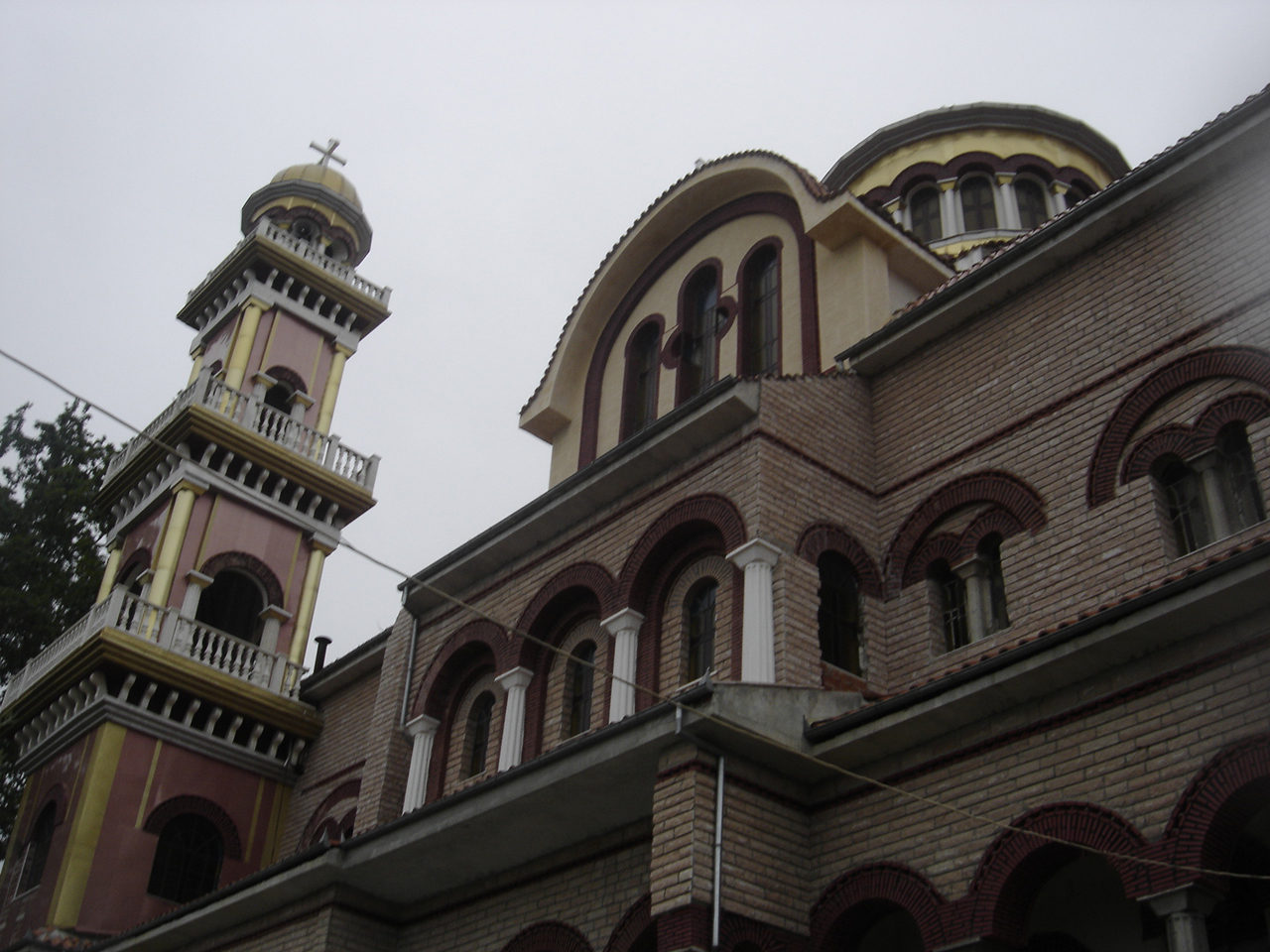
- The church of Peristasi

- Location within Greece
- Coordinates: 40°16.5′N 22°32.5′E
- Country: Greece
- Administrative region: Central Macedonia
- Regional unit: Pieria
- Municipality: Katerini
- Municipal unit: Paralia
- Elevation: 23 m (75 ft)

Population (2021)
  - Community: 2,367
- Time zone: UTC+2 (EET)
  - Summer (DST): UTC+3 (EEST)
- Postal code: 601 00
- Area code: +30-2351
- Vehicle registration: KN

Peristasi (Greek: Περίσταση) is a village and a community of the Katerini municipality, Pieria, Central Macedonia, Greece. Before the 2011 local government reform, it was part of the municipality of Paralia, of which it was a municipal district. The 2021 census recorded 2,367 inhabitants in the village.

== Geography ==
The village is located about 3 kilometres (1.8 miles) east of the city of Katerini, in the Pierian Plain. It has an altitude of 23 meters (75 feet) above sea level.

== History ==
The village was founded under the name of New Peristasis after 1922, by refugees from old Peristasis (present-day Şarköy of Eastern Thrace). Apart from the Thracians, in the last few years, Pontians and Vlachs have settled down. At the time of the axis occupation, 14 villagers were executed by the Nazis. Inside Peristasi there was the seat of the New Zealand Allies camp, which was hosted by residents of the nearby village, Kallithea. From 1947 until 1950, residents of Skoteina, who were struck by the rebels, settled in the village during the Civil War.
