= Marios Sakellariou =

Greek basketball player

Marios Sakellariou Μάριος Σακελλαρίου
No. 12 – Kymis
- Position: Small forward / power forward
- League: Greek Basket League

Personal information
- Born: June 21, 1992 (age 34) Katerini, Greece
- Listed height: 6 ft 7.5 in (2.02 m)
- Listed weight: 225 lb (102 kg)

Career information
- High school: South Carolina Academy (Columbia, South Carolina)
- Playing career: 2012–present

Career history
- 2012–2014: Pierikos Archelaos
- 2014–2015: Iraklio
- 2015–2017: Psychiko
- 2017–present: Kymis

Marios Sakellariou (Greek: Μάριος Σακελλαρίου; born June 21, 1992) is a Greek professional basketball player for Kymis of the Greek Basket League. He is 2.02 metres (6 feet 8 inches) tall. He plays at the small forward and power forward positions.

== Professional career ==
Born in Katerini, Sakellariou started playing basketball with Pierikos Archelaos, where he stayed until 2014. He then moved to Iraklio, and the next season, he moved to Psychiko of the Greek A2 League. With Psychiko, he played for two seasons, being a role player for the team.

On September 19, 2017, Sakellariou joined Kymis of the Greek Basket League.
