= Katerini =

City in Macedonia, Greece

Katerini Κατερίνη
- Municipality
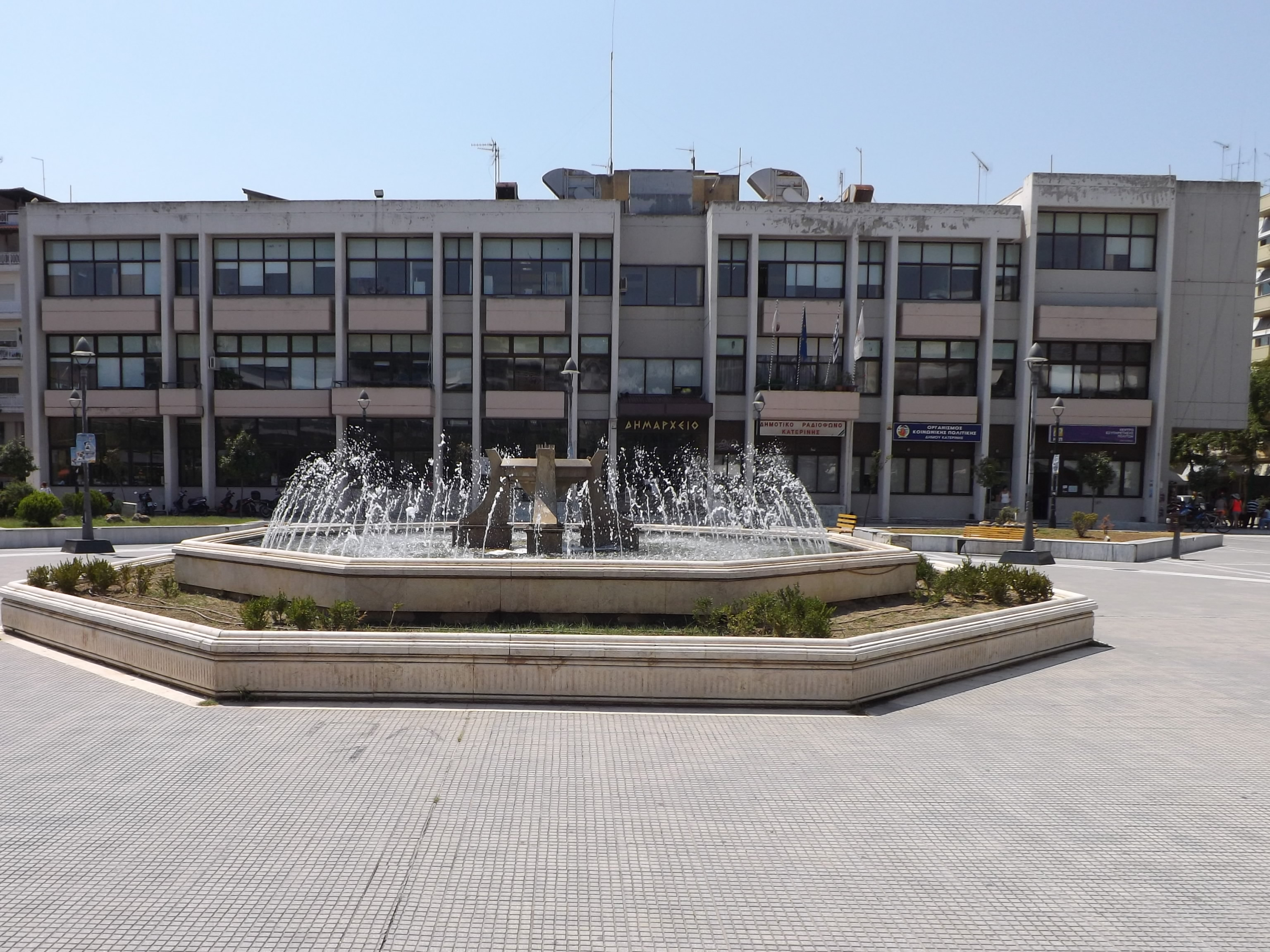
- City Hall of Katerini

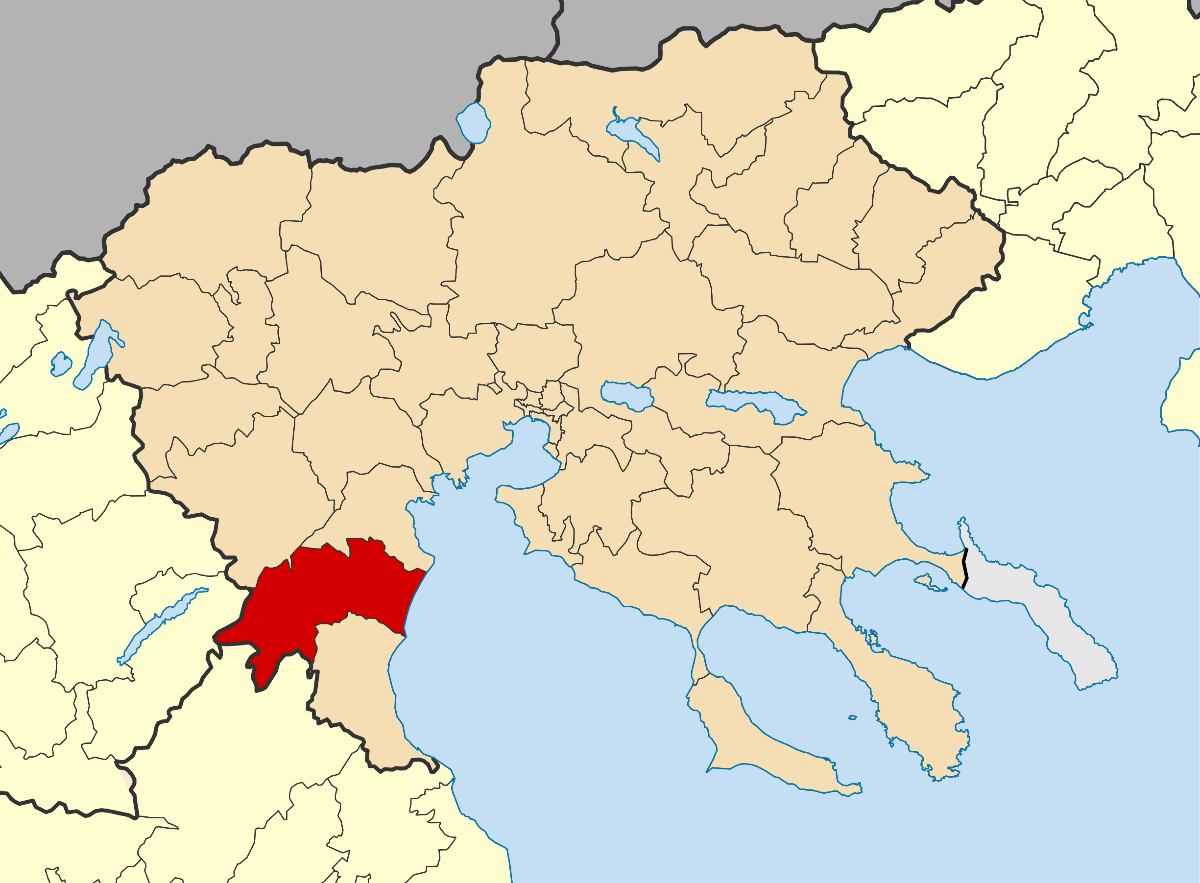

- Location within Greece
- Coordinates: 40°16′N 22°30′E
- Country: Greece
- Administrative region: Central Macedonia
- Regional unit: Pieria
- Municipality: Katerini
- Municipal unit: Katerini

Government
  - Mayor: Ioannis Doumos (since 2023)

Area
  - Municipality: 681.863 km^{2} (263.269 sq mi)
  - Municipal unit: 93.659 km^{2} (36.162 sq mi)
  - Community: 63.196 km^{2} (24.400 sq mi)
- Elevation: 30 m (98 ft)

Population (2021)
  - Municipality: 82,892
  - Density: 121.57/km^{2} (314.86/sq mi)
  - Municipal unit: 62,742
  - Municipal unit density: 669.90/km^{2} (1,735.0/sq mi)
  - Community: 59,189
  - Community density: 936.59/km^{2} (2,425.8/sq mi)
- Demonym: Kateriniotis (Greek: Κατερινιώτης)
- Time zone: UTC+2 (EET)
  - Summer (DST): UTC+3 (EEST)
- Postal code: 60100, 60131, 60132, 60133, 60134
- Area code: 23510
- Vehicle registration: KN
- Website: katerini.gr

Katerini (Greek: Κατερίνη, romanized: Kateríni, pronounced [kateˈrini]) is a city and a municipality in northern Greece. It is the capital of the Pieria regional unit in Central Macedonia. It lies on the Pierian plain, between Mount Olympus and the Thermaic Gulf, at an altitude of 14 m. According to the 2021 census, the municipality has a population of 82,891, with 59,189 people living within the city-limits of Katerini.

A popular tourist destination in northern Greece, Katerini is close to the sea (7 km) and to several archaeological sites of great interest such as the ancient city of Dion (5th century BC, 17 km away), ancient Leivithra (27 km away), ancient Pydna (16 km away) and the Castle of Platamon. The beaches of Kallithea, Korinos, Olympiaki Akti (or Katerinoskala), Paralia (where the 3rd Port Authority Department of Skala Katerini is located), Peristasi are visited by both Greek and foreign tourists during the summer season. The base of Mount Olympus and the town of Litochoro, are at a distance of around 20 km from the center of Katerini. The ski center of Elatochori in Mount Pieria is at a distance of 33.4 km from the city's center.

== Name and history ==
The origin of the name is obscure. Since the 13th century, travellers as well as maps record the existence of a settlement called Hatera (Ἅτηρα), which may have been the origin of the modern name. Thus Felix Beaujour recorded its name as "Katheri", while François Pouqueville gives the name of the settlement as "Kateri Hatera". According to another theory, the city derives its name from the small chapel dedicated to Saint Catherine (Greek: Αγία Αικατερίνη, Agia Aikaterini) to the east of the city, dating to at least the early 19th century. The latter hypothesis influenced official usage in Greek, where the city is found as "Aikaterini" (Greek: Αικατερίνη) or "Agia Aikaterini" (Greek: Αγία Αικατερίνη) until the early 20th century, when the vernacular name Katerini (Greek: Κατερίνη) prevailed.

According to the reports of travellers, at the turn of the 19th century, the city had four to five thousand inhabitants, mostly Greeks. In 1806, William Martin Leake recorded 100 hearths, while four years later Daniel recorded 140. For the remainder of the 19th century, the number of homes remained steady at about 300, with a population in 1900 of 2,070 Orthodox Christians and 600 Muslims.

The city was liberated by the Greek 7th Infantry Division from the Ottoman rule and annexed to the Greece on 16 October 1912, during the First Balkan War. It has been part of Greece since then. Refugees from the Greek genocide settled in Katerini. With the population exchange between Greece and Turkey in 1923 the city's Muslims were expelled, while Greek refugees from Eastern Thrace and Asia Minor took their place, almost doubling the city's population from 6,540 in 1920 to 10,138 in 1928.

During Axis Occupation of Greece by the Axis Powers in World War II, Katerini went under Nazi German occupation on 14 April 1941, and was liberated on 26 October 1944.

== Geography ==
=== Administrative division ===
The Municipality of Katerini was formed in 2011 with the Kallikratis Programme administrative reform by the merger of the following 6 former municipalities, that became municipal units of the newly formed Municipality of Katerini.

The municipality Katerini is subdivided into 6 municipal units, each of which is divided into municipal communities.

Municipality of Katerini
Municipal Units
M.U. Elafina	M.U. Katerini	M.U. Korinos
Municipal Communities	Municipal Communities	Municipal Communities
Aronas; Elafos; Exochi; Katalonia; Lagorrachi; Moschopotamos; Palaio Keramidi; Trilofos	Ano Agios Ioannis; Ganochora; Katerini; Neokaisareia; Svoronos	Kato Agios Ioannis; Korinos; Koukkos; Nea Trapezounta; Sevasti
M.U. Paralia	M.U. Petra	M.U. Pierioi
Municipal Communities	Municipal Communities	Municipal Communities
Kallithea; Paralia; Peristasi	Agios Dimitrios; Foteina; Lofos; Milia; Moschochori	Elatochori; Ritini; Vria

City of Katerini
Major Districts
Center (Greek: Κέντρο); Analipsi (Ανάληψη); Nea Zoi (Νέα Ζωή); Agia Anna (Αγία Άννα); Evaggelika (Ευαγγελικά); Thrakiotika (Θρακιώτικα); Agia Triada (Αγία Τριάδα); Agios Fotios (Άγιος Φώτιος); Municipal Park (Δημοτικό Πάρκο); Agia Paraskevi (Αγία Παρασκευή); Ergatikes Katikies (Εργατικές Κατοικίες)	Vatan (Βατάν); Hiradika (Χηράδικα); Paradisos (Παράδεισος); Mylavlakos (Μυλαύλακος); Agioi Pantes (Άγιοι Πάντες); Katafygiotika (Καταφυγιώτικα); Agia Aikaterini (Αγία Αικατερίνη); Ethniko Stadio (Εθνικό Στάδιο); Kapnikos Stathmos (Καπνικός Σταθμός); Astika (Aston) [Αστικά, (Αστών)]; Railway station (Σιδηροδρομικός Σταθμός)

=== Climate ===
Katerini has a humid subtropical climate that is characterised by warm to hot, dry summers and cool and more humid winters (Köppen climate classification: Cfa).

Climate data for Katerini
Month	Jan	Feb	Mar	Apr	May	Jun	Jul	Aug	Sep	Oct	Nov	Dec	Year
Mean daily maximum °C (°F)	9.0 (48.2)	11.9 (53.4)	15.0 (59.0)	20.0 (68.0)	25.1 (77.2)	30.3 (86.5)	33.3 (91.9)	32.9 (91.2)	28.5 (83.3)	22.4 (72.3)	15.7 (60.3)	10.9 (51.6)	21.3 (70.2)
Daily mean °C (°F)	4.9 (40.8)	6.8 (44.2)	9.8 (49.6)	14.2 (57.6)	18.9 (66.0)	23.6 (74.5)	26.3 (79.3)	25.9 (78.6)	22.1 (71.8)	17 (63)	11.5 (52.7)	7 (45)	15.7 (60.3)
Mean daily minimum °C (°F)	0.8 (33.4)	1.8 (35.2)	4.6 (40.3)	8.5 (47.3)	12.8 (55.0)	16.9 (62.4)	19.4 (66.9)	19.0 (66.2)	15.7 (60.3)	11.6 (52.9)	7.4 (45.3)	3.2 (37.8)	10.1 (50.2)
Average precipitation mm (inches)	38 (1.5)	36 (1.4)	43 (1.7)	33 (1.3)	46 (1.8)	31 (1.2)	24 (0.9)	18 (0.7)	28 (1.1)	45 (1.8)	53 (2.1)	53 (2.1)	448 (17.6)
Source: climate-data.org

== Local cuisine ==
Katerini is located near several villages which are renowned for their high quality products, specifically kiwis, wines, cherries, strawberries, apples, olives, olive oil, truffle oil, truffles, mushrooms, grapes, mineral water, herbs with the most well-known being the Greek mountain tea locally in Pieria known as "Tea of Olympus", honey and honey products (propolis, royal jelly, beeswax ointment, bee pollen), dairy products (milk, butter, kefir, yogurt), cheese (feta, kasseri, manouri, anthotyros, kefalotyri, mizithra), chickens (meat, eggs), black pigs (meat, cured meat, sausages). Katerini Steppe Cattle originate from Katerini. This breed belonging to the Podolian cattle is at high risk of extinction, and is well known for its meat and milk. It is found now in the region of Thessaly. The cuisine of Katerini is Greece's Macedonian cuisine. Seafood comes mainly from the seaport of Paralia.

== Economy ==
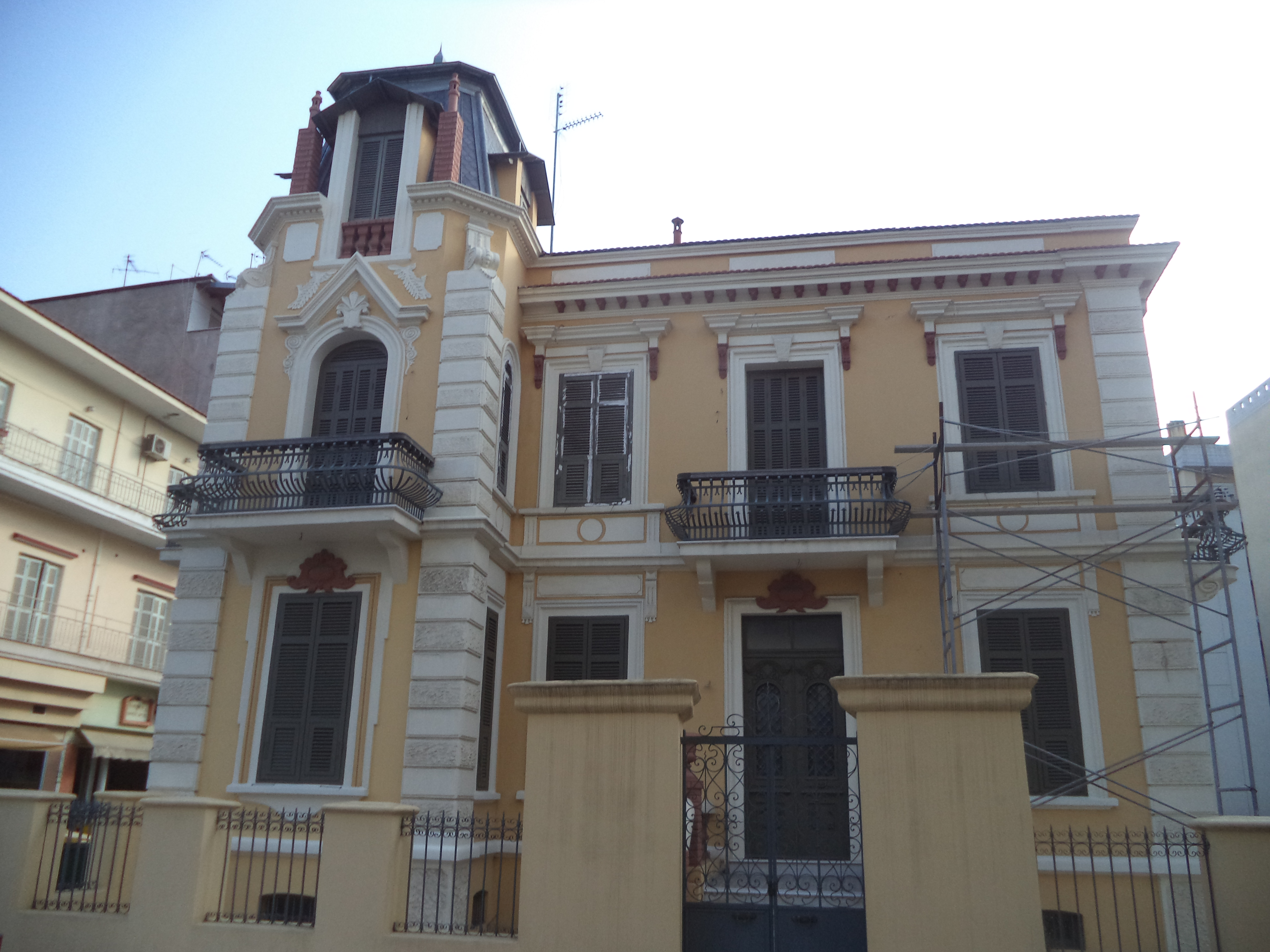
Nine Muses Art Center (former Dimitrios Tsalopoulos Mansion) built in 1908 declared an Asset of Artistic Interest in 1979 by the Ministry of Culture

Katerini is the administrative and economic center of Pieria. In 2022 it joined the EU Smart Tourism Destinations Project for smart tourism. The project aims to promote sustainable development practices and access to tourism and hospitality through Information and Communication Technologies (ICT) with the collaboration of other EU selected destinations. Katerini has received a gold award of Circular Economy and a silver award of Environmental Excellence to Local Authorities at the Environmental Awards 2022 at Hellenic Foundation for Culture on 28 September 2022. It is the first municipality in Greece in which the pilot implementation of the SMARTREC Platform for the recycling of cooking oil is taking place. This implementation is with collaboration with the International Hellenic University. The municipality participates in the European program "LIFE-IP AdaptInGR – Boosting the implementation of adaptation policy across Greece" (2019–2026) for the adaptation to the effects of climate change, led by the Ministry of Environment and Energy.

The following organizations are based in Katerini: the Chamber of Commerce & Industry of Pieria, Dimitra Agricultural-Livestock-farming Association of Katerini, Sheep-Goat Farmers of Pieria Agricultural Cooperative of Prefecture of Pieria, Agios Modestos Sheep-Goat Farmers Association of Pieria, Union of Agricultural Cooperatives of Pieria, Consortium of Agricultural Tobacco Cooperatives of Pieria, Pieria Hoteliers Association, Federation of Letting Rooms and Accommodations of Pieria, Imathia, Pella (OEDDPIP), Travel Agents Association of Pieria.

Every year it operates the Trade-Craft Exhibition Activity of Pieria & Central Makedonia (EBEP-KM), and the open-air market and traditional Greek festival Emporopanigyri known as Panigyri in August-September, taking place at the exhibition area of the Municipality of Katerini in the Andromachi settlement. The Park Festival is held at the Municipal Park of Katerini in April with street food and fun activities. In October, the Fest of Honey for honey and bee products is held at the Municipal Park of Katerini, organized by the Agios Filaretos o Eleimon Bee-keeping Association of Pieria, under the auspices of the Municipality of Katerini. The Municipality of Katerini, in collaboration with the Zeus Athletic Cultural Club of Pieria's Runners, organizes every year the "Run for Katerini" 8 km road race, part of the events celebrating the liberation of Katerini on 16 October 1912.

=== Agriculture ===
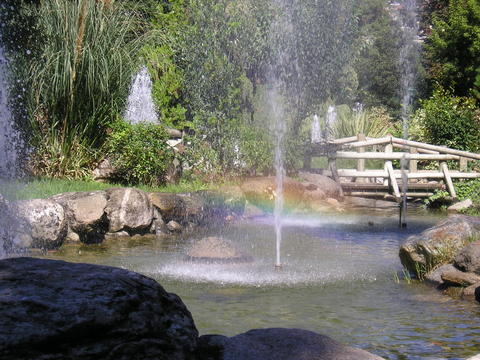
Katerini Municipal Park where there is a small artificial lake

Katerini lies in the middle of a plain and is thus an agricultural city. 26,775 people were employed in agriculture in Pieria as of 2000. There is cultivation of tobacco in the region and a lot of people spend considerable resources for its development and for exports of the product. The Union of Agricultural Cooperatives of Pieria has 9,000 members, of which 2,000 grow tobacco. Katerini - and Pieria - is the area in Greece where kiwis were first cultivated in 1973 at the initiative of Tasos Michos who was application agronomist at the Pieria Directorate of Agriculture. The Aktinidio Pierias is cultivated in Pieria and is a part of the Hayward kiwi variety. It is registered as a Protected Geographical Indication (PGI) product with the awarding of certification on 22 November 2002.

=== Tourism ===
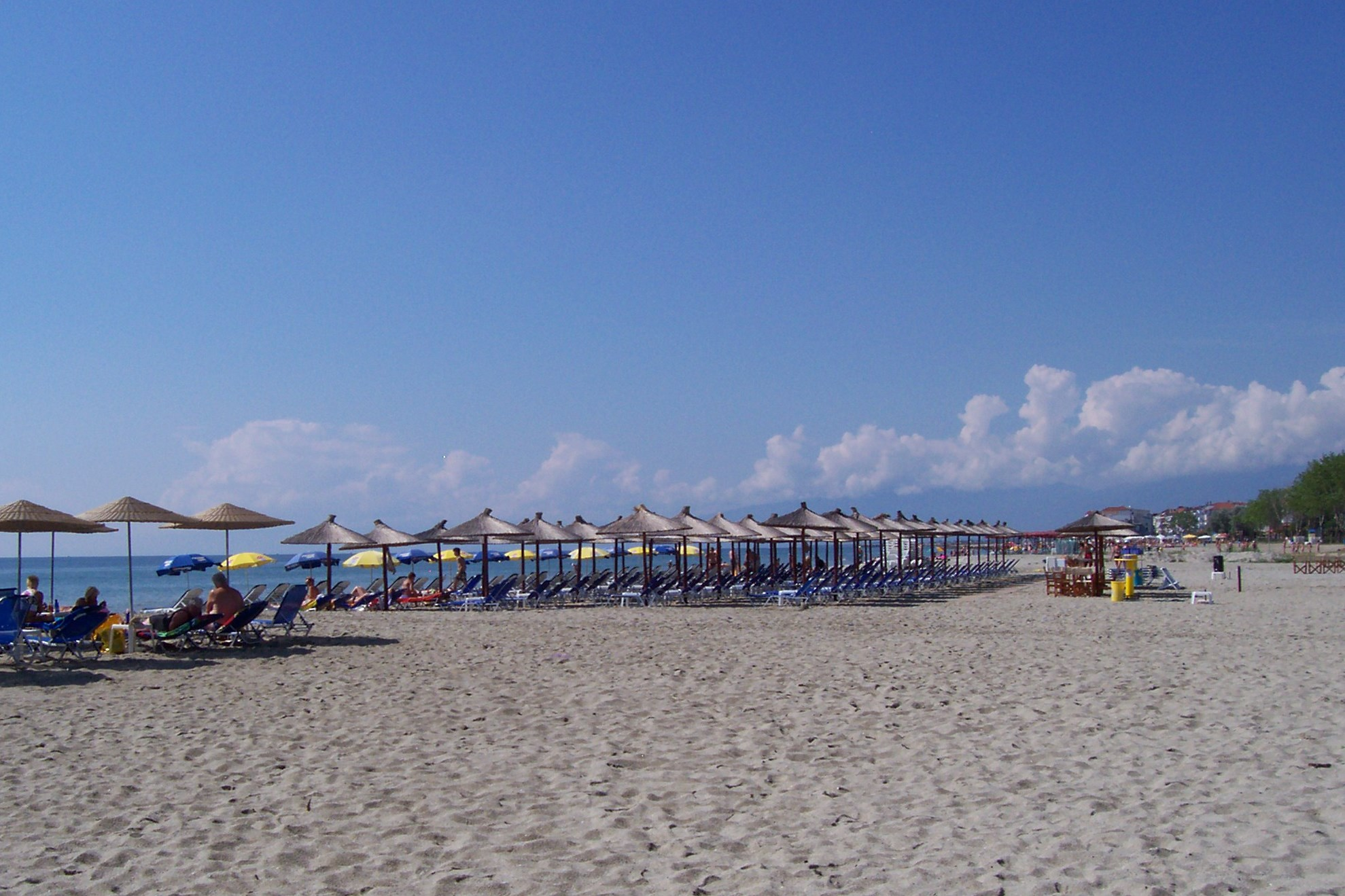
Paralia beach where there is the port and the pier.

Katerini is a popular tourist destination that attracts visitors from Greece and abroad. Within the boundaries of the municipality, there are seasonal and all year round over 230 hotels, that can accommodate more than 8,600 people, short-term rental accommodatios, and tourist accommodations. The vast majority of the tourist infrastructure, including tens of tavernas and cafes, lie in Paralia and Olympiaki Akti. These two localities are linked with roads, sidewalks and bicycle lanes. Winter tourism has started developing in the area with the Elatochori ski resort. Katerini is surrounded by ancient archaeological sites as Dion, Leivithra, Pydna, Louloudies and Platamon Castle. The wider area of Mount Olympus was inscribed on the UNESCO World Heritage List as a mixed World Heritage Site since 2026, it is also a UNESCO World Biosphere Reserve since 1981. Part of it has been declared a national park, and serves as a popular hiking destination.

== Public health ==
The National Health System (ESY) in Katerini has the:

- General Hospital of Katerini, in the area of Neo Keramidi.
- Health Center of Katerini.
- 4th Local Health Group (T.OM.Y.) of Katerini housed in the premises of the Health Center of Katerini and National Organization for Health Care Services (EOPYY).
- 12th Local Health Group (T.OM.Y.) of Katerini housed in the premises of the former General Hospital of Katerini.
- Regional Care Center in Paralia operates each summer season.
- Atraktos Center for the Prevention of Addictions and Promotion of Psychosocial Health of the Regional Unit of Pieria.

The Municipal Social Care Center of Katerini of the Municipality of Katerini is housed in the premises of the former General Hospital of Katerini and provides primary health care services to the vulnerable social groups that has been equipped and funding from a Migrant and Refugee Fund (MRF) grant received through the Council of Europe Development Bank. The social welfare program "Help at Home" operates by Municipality of Katerini supports vulnerable, elderly and people with disabilities who are unable to support themselves and are in need of help at home. In 2020, Municipality of Katerini acquired a mobile (vehicle mounted frequency selective) measurement station that monitor the electromagnetic field levels from antenna stations in the frequency range 100KHz–7 GHz, which is operated and controlled by the Greek Atomic Energy Commission (EEAE), with the aim of public information about high-frequency electromagnetic fields levels. The results are presented through an interactive web portal and mobile application.

Municipality of Katerini operates its office for local stray animals.

== Transport ==
Katerini is located 68 kilometres from Thessaloniki, with the close distance between the two cities (68 km), has been beneficial for Katerini's development over recent years. Katerini is accessible from the A1/E75 Athens–Thessaloniki motorway (with the Katerini's South, East and North interchanges) and the A2 motorway to the north. It is served by Intercity, Proastiakos (suburban train) and local trains on the main Athens-Thessaloniki railway line and there is a comprehensive regional and national bus service with its hub in the city.

=== Local transport ===
The national bus lines service is provided by the KTEL Pieria station (Pieria intercity (coach) bus station, terminal) for intercity buses located in Katerini. The local bus lines between Katerini and its nearby settlements are served by the urban buses of the KTEL Katerini, which has lines towards Ano Agios Ioannis, Aronas, Dion, Moschochori, Olympiaki Akti, Paralia, Palaio Keramidi, Neo Nosokomeio (New General Hospital of Katerini), Nea Trapezounta, Vrontou. These routes serve all the settlements that lie between Katerini and the aforementioned final destinations.

=== Road transport ===
The Athens–Thessaloniki–Evzonoi road corridor, consisting of the A1 motorway and EO1, passes through Katerini to the east: the EO13 branches off the EO1 and passes the city centre to the north, heading westbound towards Elassona. Five provincial roads also radiate from Katerini: Pieria Provincial Road 1, eastbound towards Paralia Katerinis; Provincial Road 2, northbound towards Ryakia; Provincial Road 3, northwestbound towards Elafos and Katalonia; Provincial Road 4, westbound towards Moschopotamos; and Provincial Road 5, southbound towards Limenas Litochorou.

There is also a partially complete ring road, circling Katerini clockwise from exit 73 of the A1 in the south, to Provincial Road 1 in the east.

Intercity bus routes delivered by the KTEL Pieria, connect Katerini directly with Athens, Thessaloniki, Elassona, Alexandreia and all the settlements of Pieria that are not served by the urban buses of KTEL Katerini. There are also privately held international bus routes that connect Katerini with several cities in Albania and Bulgaria.

=== Rail links ===
Katerini Railway Station is located just outside the city center. The main line of the Greek railway system that connects Athens with Thessaloniki passes through Katerini. As a result, the city is connected directly with Larissa and Thessaloniki via the Thessaloniki Suburban Railway (Thessaloniki Proastiakos) suburban electric train. It is also connected with Athens and all the intermediate stations by Intercity train routes.

== Demographics ==
=== Historical population ===
Year	Community population	Municipal unit population	Municipality population
1913	7,393	-	-
1920	6,540	-	-
1928	10,138	-	-
1940	16,938	-	-
1951	24,605	-	-
1961	28,046	-	-
1971	29,046	-	-
1981	38,404	-	-
1991	42,381	-	-
2001	53,418	57,098	83,387
2011	58,309	62,205	85,851
2021	59,189	62,742	80,700

=== Local communities ===
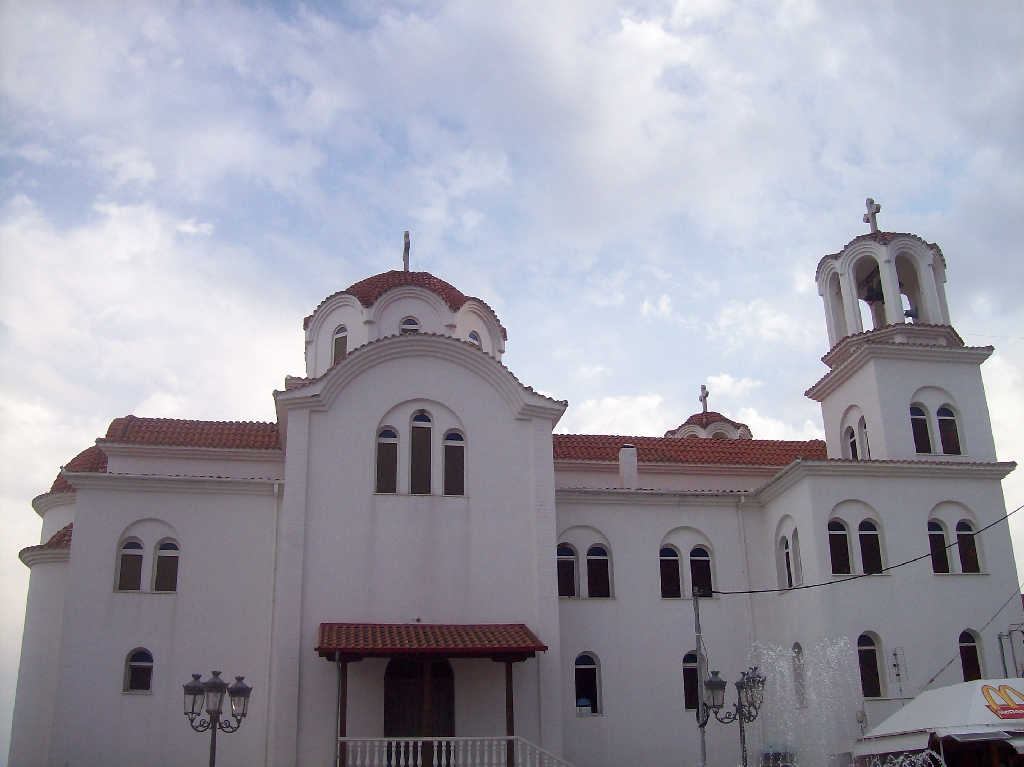
St. Fotini Church at the beach in Paralia

Katerini is home to a significant Aromanian population that exceeds 3,000 people. Aromanians of Katerini mainly descend from nearby Aromanian settlements of Livadi and Kokkinopilos, and in lesser numbers from Samarina, Moscopole, Avdella, Perivoli and Smixi. According to some sources the Aromanians formed a majority amongst the city's Christian population in the beginning of the 20th century. At the beginning of Giorgakis Olympios pedestrian street in the central Katerini district is located the bust statue of Giorgakis Olympios (1772–1821) who was an armatole of Aromanian descent and military commander during the Greek War of Independence against the Ottoman Empire.

=== Immigrants ===
As of 2001, the Municipal Unit of Katerini (then Municipality of Katerini) was home to 2,794 foreign nationals (4.9% of the total population). Among them the most populous ethnic group was Albanians (2.5%) followed by Georgians (0.5%), Russians (0.4%) and Bulgarians (0.3%). A large Greek community of the Katerini diaspora is particularly located in Boston, Massachusetts.

=== Religion ===
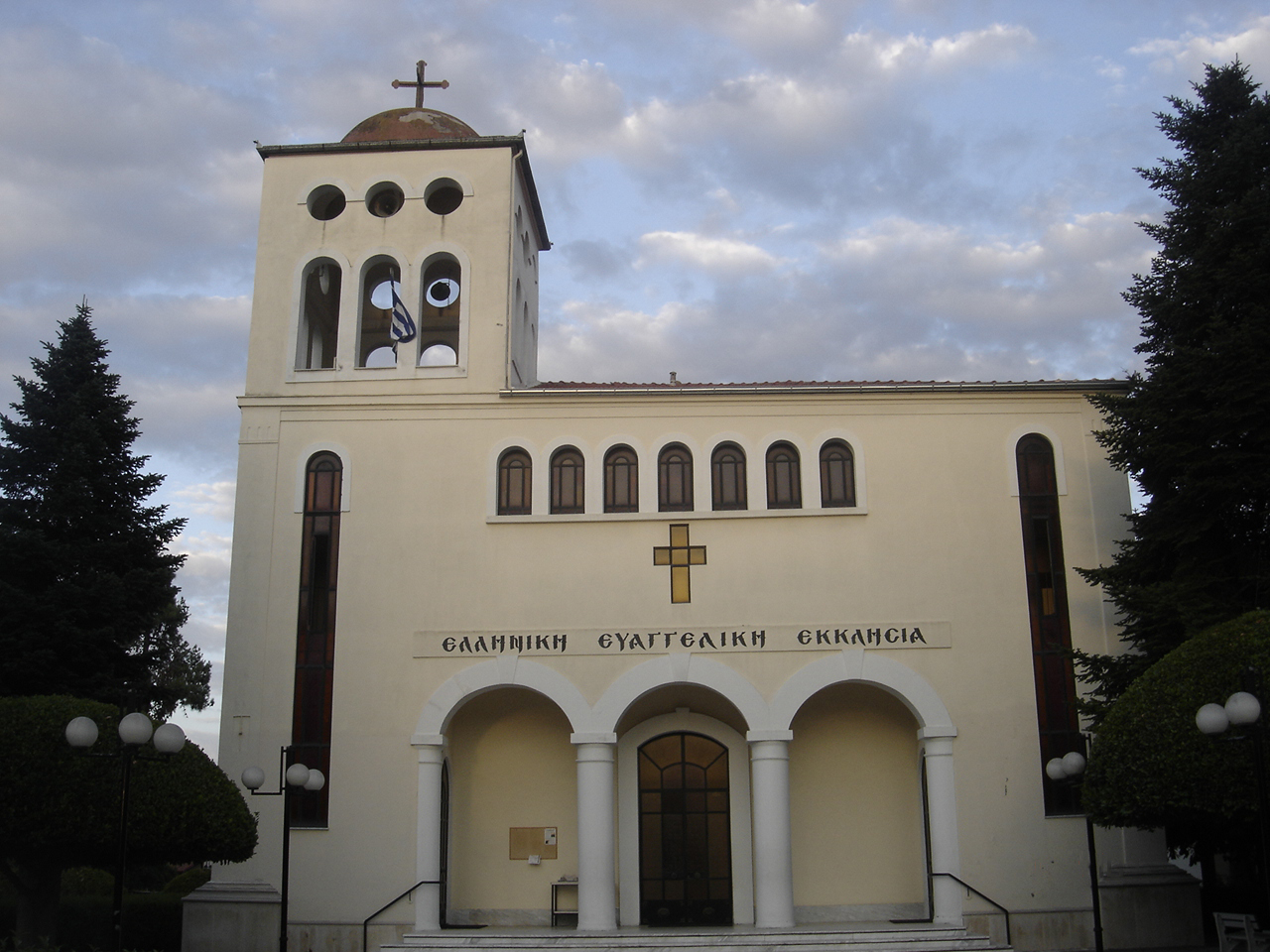
Evangelical Church at the Park of the Evangelicals in the Evaggelika districkt of Katerini, which was built in 1925 and rebuilt in 1931.

The Metropolis of Kitros, Katerini and Platamon, a part of the Church of Greece which is a part of the wider Greek Orthodox Church, has 16 congregations within the city of Katerini. There is also an Old Calendarist church in the city. Katerini has a relatively numerous Protestant community, as a result of the organised settlement of Evangelical Greek refugees from Asia Minor and Pontus. Today the Greek Evangelical Church of Katerini has almost 1,100 followers, many of them are concentrated in the Evaggelika district of the city of Katerini. Other Protestant denominations, that have a church within the city, are the Free Apostolic Church of Pentecost, the Greek Apostolic Church of Pentecost and the Seventh-day Adventist Church. The Protestant community is fully integrated in the life of the city, but in the past there were tensions between the Evangelical community and the Greek Orthodox majority. These tensions led to the arson of the Evangelical Church of Katerini from a Greek Orthodox mob in March 1930.

== Education ==
The city of Katerini public schools is a part of the public education system consisting of member schools: Preschool, Primary, Gymnasium (middle school) schools, Evening Gymnasium, Second Chance Adult School (SDE), Unified Special Vocational Gymnasium-High School Laboratory of Special Vocational Education (EEEEK), Vocational School (EPAS) of Public Employment Service (DYPA), General High Schools, Evening General High School, Music High School, Vocational High School, Model Vocational High School, Evening Vocational High School, Unified Special Vocational Gymnasium-High School, Public School of Advanced Vocational Training (DSAEK) of Katerini, Public School of Advanced Vocational Training (DSAEK) of the General Hospital of Katerini, International Hellenic University - Katerini Campus, Center of Lifelong Learning (KDVM) of the Municipality of Katerini, Re-Training Programs of non-formal education with 380 hours each program of the Ministry of Tourism supervised by the Experimental School of Advanced Vocational Training of Tourism of Makedonia for employed and unemployed persons of tourism professions operate at times after an official public announcement.

Various others are: Private schools (preschool, primary, secondary), Municipal Odeion of Katerini that is a conservatoire of music education, Osios Dionysios of Olympus - School of Byzantine Music & Traditional Instruments (and Traditional Singing) of the Metropolis of Kitros, Katerini and Platamon, Private School of Meat Professions of Lydia, Private School of Advanced Vocational Training (ISAEK) of Lydia, Private School for Lifeguards of Lifeguard Patrol, Rescue Team of Pieria which provides first aid certified training courses, School of Samaritans and Rescuers of the Hellenic Red Cross (HRC) Volunteer Corps of Samaritans, Rescuers and Lifeguards - Branch of Katerini.

From 2006 to 2016 was operating the Second Chance Seminary School of Katerini of the Ministry of Education, that was suspended its operation since the academic year 2016–2017, which was a two years public ecclesiastical lifelong learning education boarding school housed in the Ecclesiastical Guesthouse of the Metropolis of Kitros, Katerini and Platamon in the Prosilio settlement.

== Sports ==
=== Athletic centers ===
- 1st Municipal Athletic Center of Katerini (A DAK) where is the 4,995-seat open-air Stadium of Katerini.
- 2nd Municipal Athletic Center of Katerini (B DAK) "Theodoros Diamantopoulos" comprises Indoor Sports Stadium, football field, tennis courts, basketball courts, indoor shooting range, indoor swimming pool.
- Indoor Sports Stadium of Katerini Railway Station.

=== Football ===
Katerini is represented by two football teams in the national leagues; Pierikos, has its home stadium named 1st Municipal Athletic Center of Katerini, a club currently playing in the Gamma Ethniki (Third National) category, and the women's football club of Pierides Muses, playing in the Women's Gamma Ethniki category.

=== Other sports ===
- Pierikos-Archelaos B.C.. GAS Archelaos Katerinis.

Sport clubs based in Katerini
Club	Founded	Sports	Achievements
Pierikos (Former:Megas Alexandros Katerini & Olympos Katerini)	1961 (1922) (1946)	Football, Volleyball	Earlier presence in A Ethniki football, finalist Greek cup
GAS Archelaos Katerinis	1956	Handball, Track and Field and other sports	Panhellenic titles in Greek Handball
Ethnikos Katerini F.C.	1973	Football	Earlier presence in Gamma Ethniki
Vataniakos F.C.	1978	Football	Earlier presence in Beta Ethniki
Pierikos-Archelaos B.C.	2008	Basketball	Presence in A1 Ethniki and A2 Ethniki

- Chess Club of Katerini
- Budokan Dojo Katerini (karate)
- Go-kart Track of Katerini in Paralia
- Free Cyclists of Pieria (ELPPI)
- Olympios Cycling Club of Katerini
- Cycling Escape of Pieria - Cycling Club
- DIAS Environmental and Cycling Club of Katerini
- Mad Jackals Motorcycle Riders Club of Katerini
- Athlos Sports Club (weightlifting, track and field)
- Aiolos Sports and Cultural Club of Katerini (volleyball)
- Olympioi of Katerini Gymnastics Sports Club (wrestling)
- Pyrros Dimas Sports Club (weightlifting, track and field)
- Zeus Athletic Cultural Club of Pieria's Runners
- Panthers Gymnastics Sports Club of Pieria (basketball)
- Sports Gymnastics Club of Pieria (AGEP 2011) (basketball)
- Katerini Tennis Club
- Tennis Club of Katerini (OAK)
- Equestrian Club of Pieria
- DIAS Sports Swimming Club
- Nautical Club of Katerini (NOKAT)
- Asterias Sports Academy (water sports)
- Nereus Sports Academy of Katerini (water sports)
- Vouliaxtaria Underwater Explorers and Diving Club
- Sports Academy of Pieria '92 - Swimming Academy
- Club of Greek Mountaineers (SEO) of Katerini
- Hellenic Mountaineering Club (EOS) of Katerini
- Ski Club of Katerini - Skiing & Snowboarding Academy
- Aero Club of Pieria (paragliding, hang gliding, aeromodelling)
- Tritones of Katerini Friends of Free Diving - Underwater Fishing
- Poseidon Sports & Cultural Club of Katerini - Swimming Academy

== Notable people ==
- Basil Athanasiadis (1970), musician, composer
- Eleni Chatziliadou (1993), karateka, karate world champion 2018
- Georgios Diamantidis (1984), swimmer who specialized in long-distance freestyle events
- Elias Gaganelis, founder of the Replicar Hellas car firm in Katerini
- Dimitris Giannoulis (1995), footballer
- Apostolos Kilessopoulos (1942), painter, director, university professor
- Stelios Malezas (1985), footballer
- Dimos Magklaras (1940–2024), long jumper
- Katerina Nikolaidou (1992), rower, 4th place 2016 Olympic Games, 2nd place in the lightweight single sculls at the 2014 and 2013 World Rowing Championships
- Kyriakos Papadopoulos (1992), footballer
- Elisavet Pesiridou (1992), hurdler
- Marios Sakellariou (born 1992), Greek professional basketball player
- Yannis K. Semertzidis (1961), physicist
- Alexandros Tziolis (1985), footballer
- Aimilios Xanthopoulos (1903–1943), politician, mayor of Katerini

== International relations ==
Katerini is twinned with:

- Brăila, Romania
- Karlovo, Bulgaria
- Čačak, Serbia
- Kragujevac, Serbia
- Maintal, Germany
- Moosburg, Austria
- Surgut, Russia

== Gallery ==
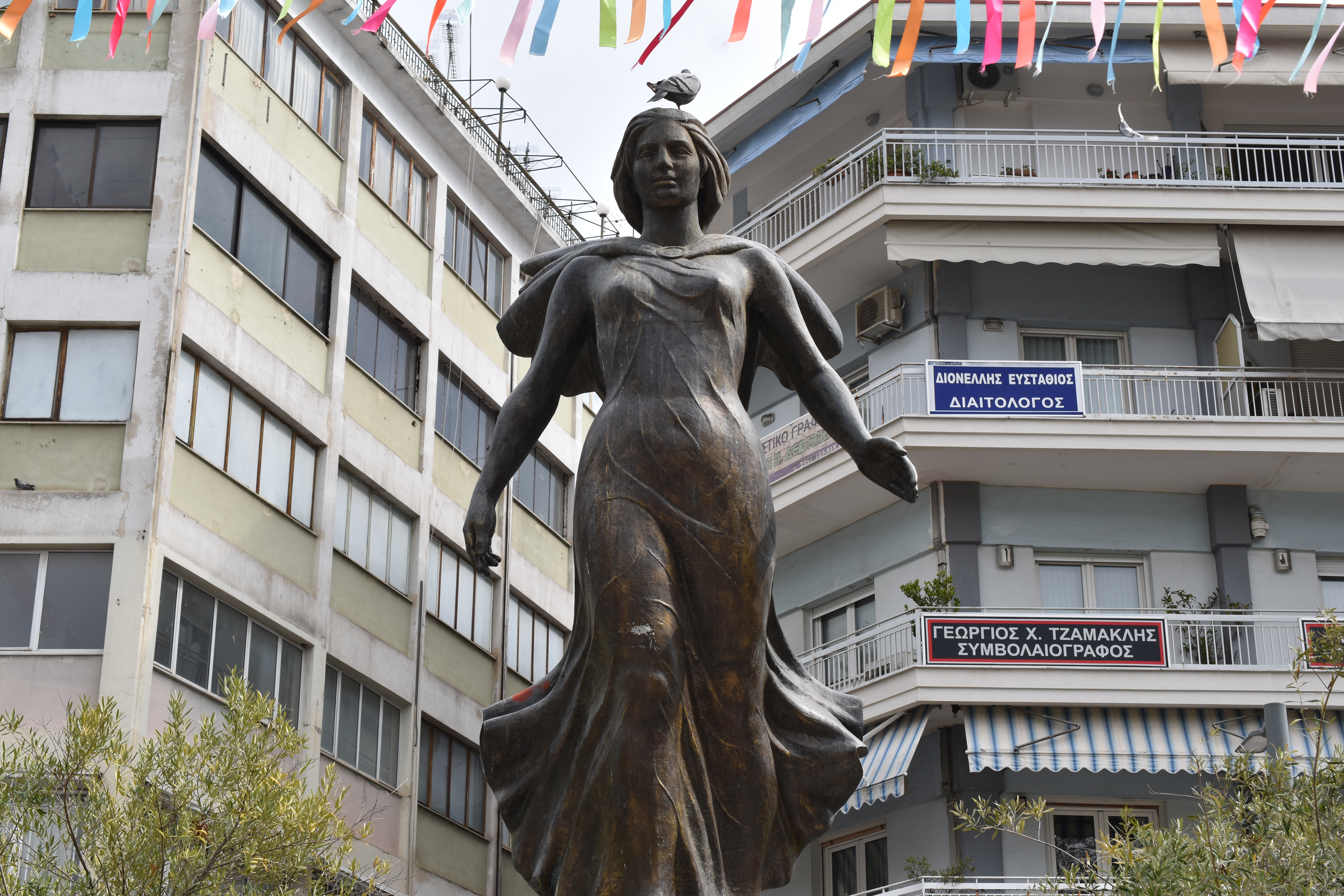
The Statue of Liberty at Eleftherias (Liberty) Square that is the Katerini’s central square

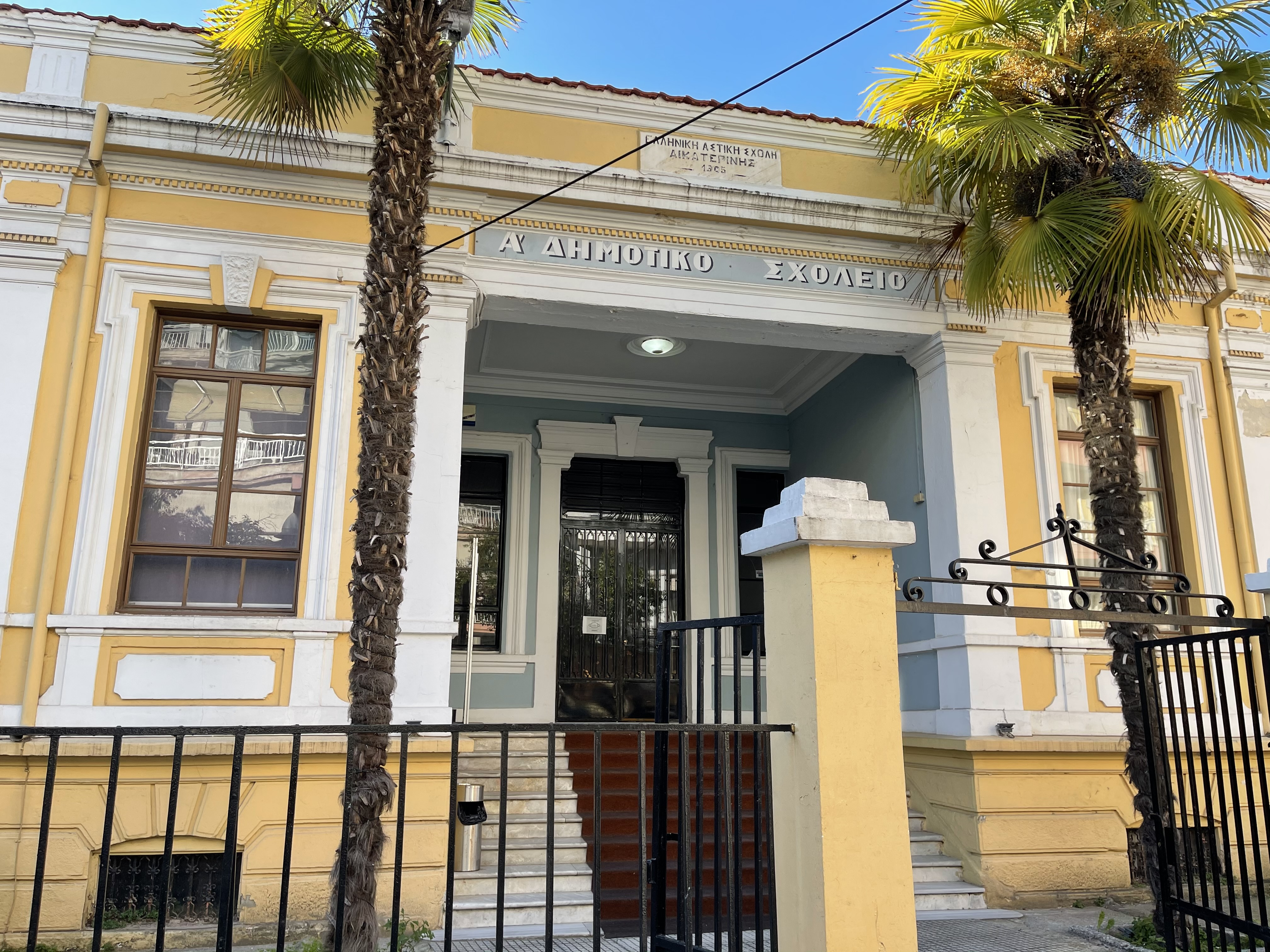
Civil School of Katerini (former 1st Primary School of Katerini)

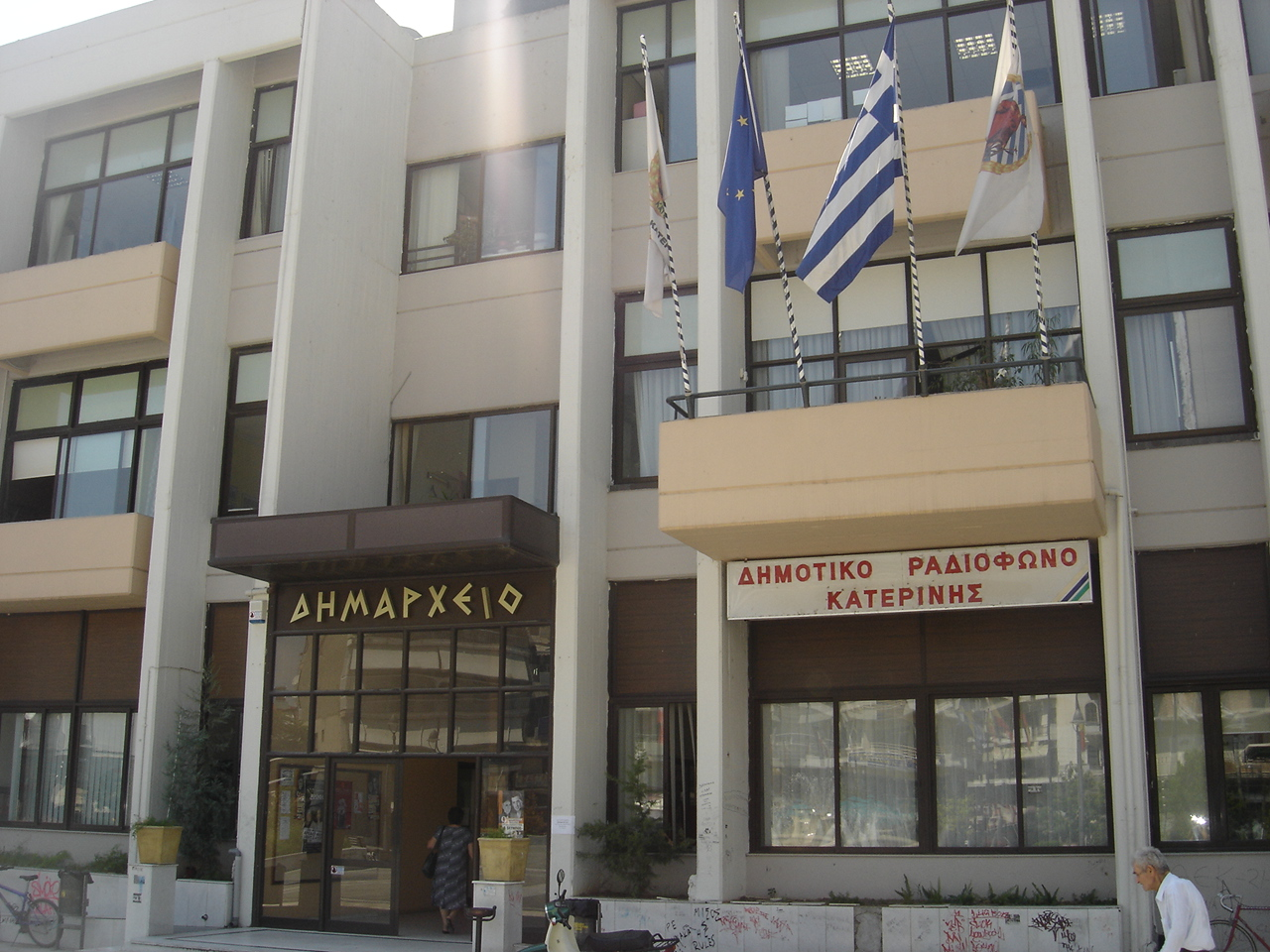
City Hall of Katerini at City Hall Square

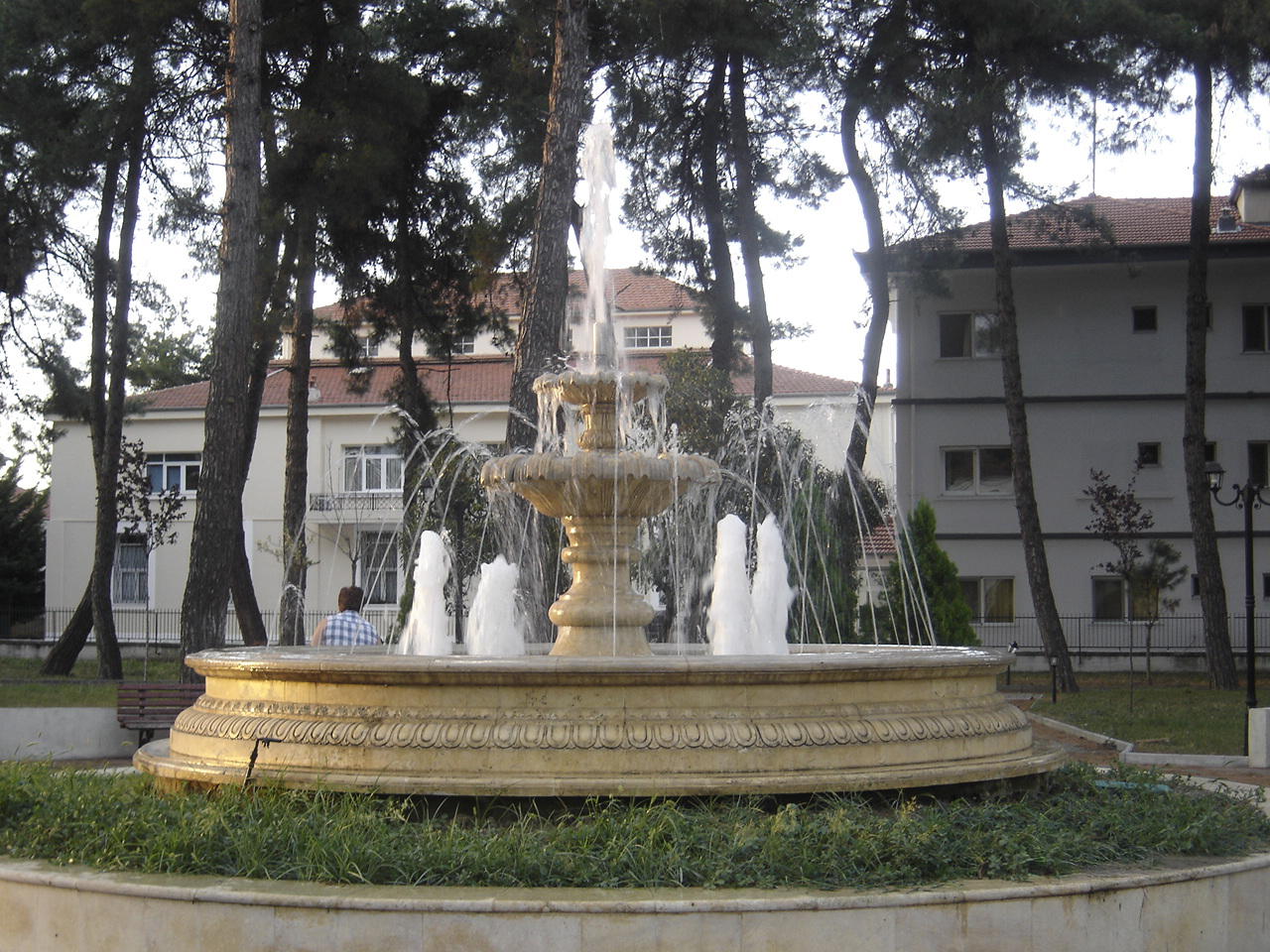
A fountain in Municipal Park

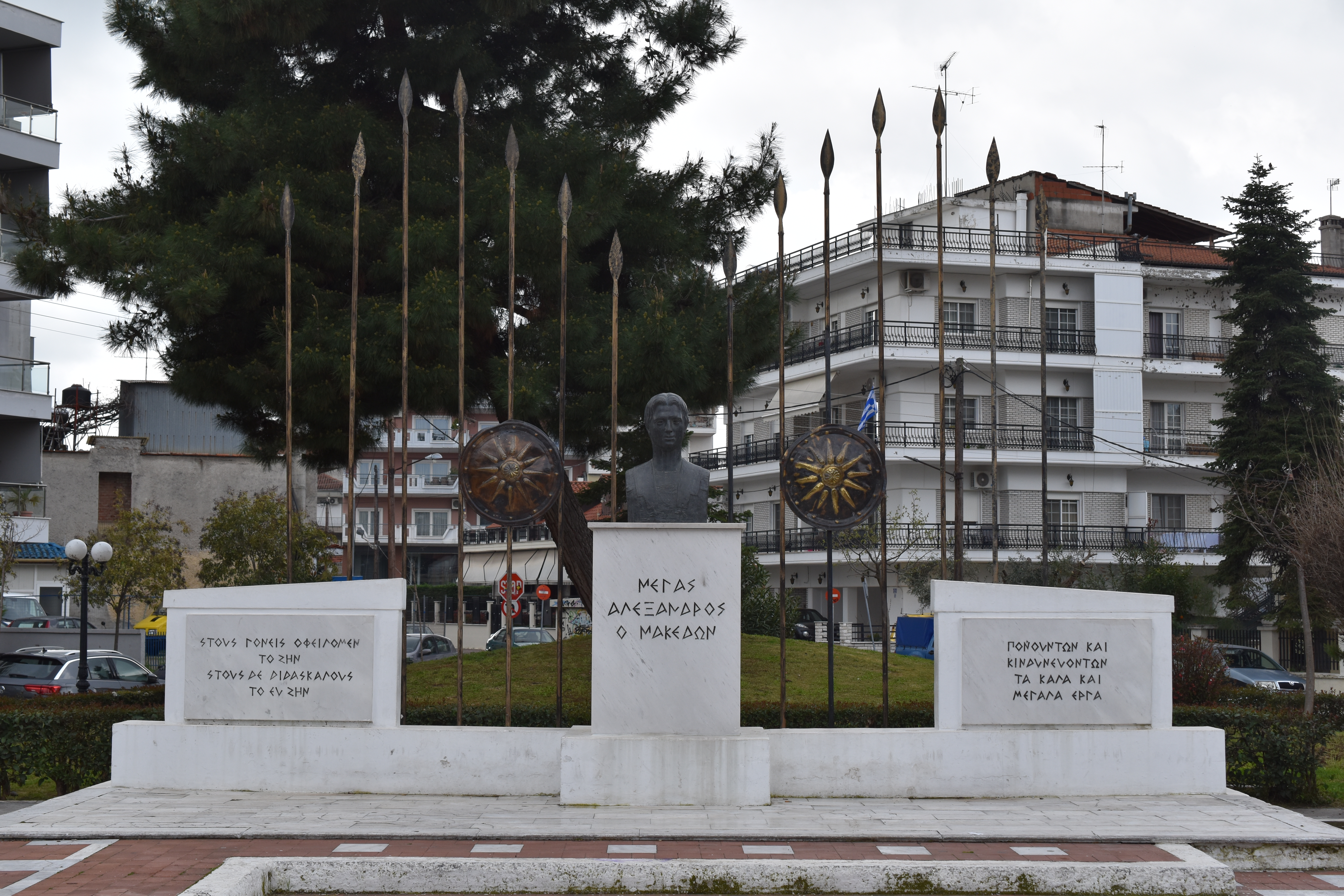
Heroes’ Square

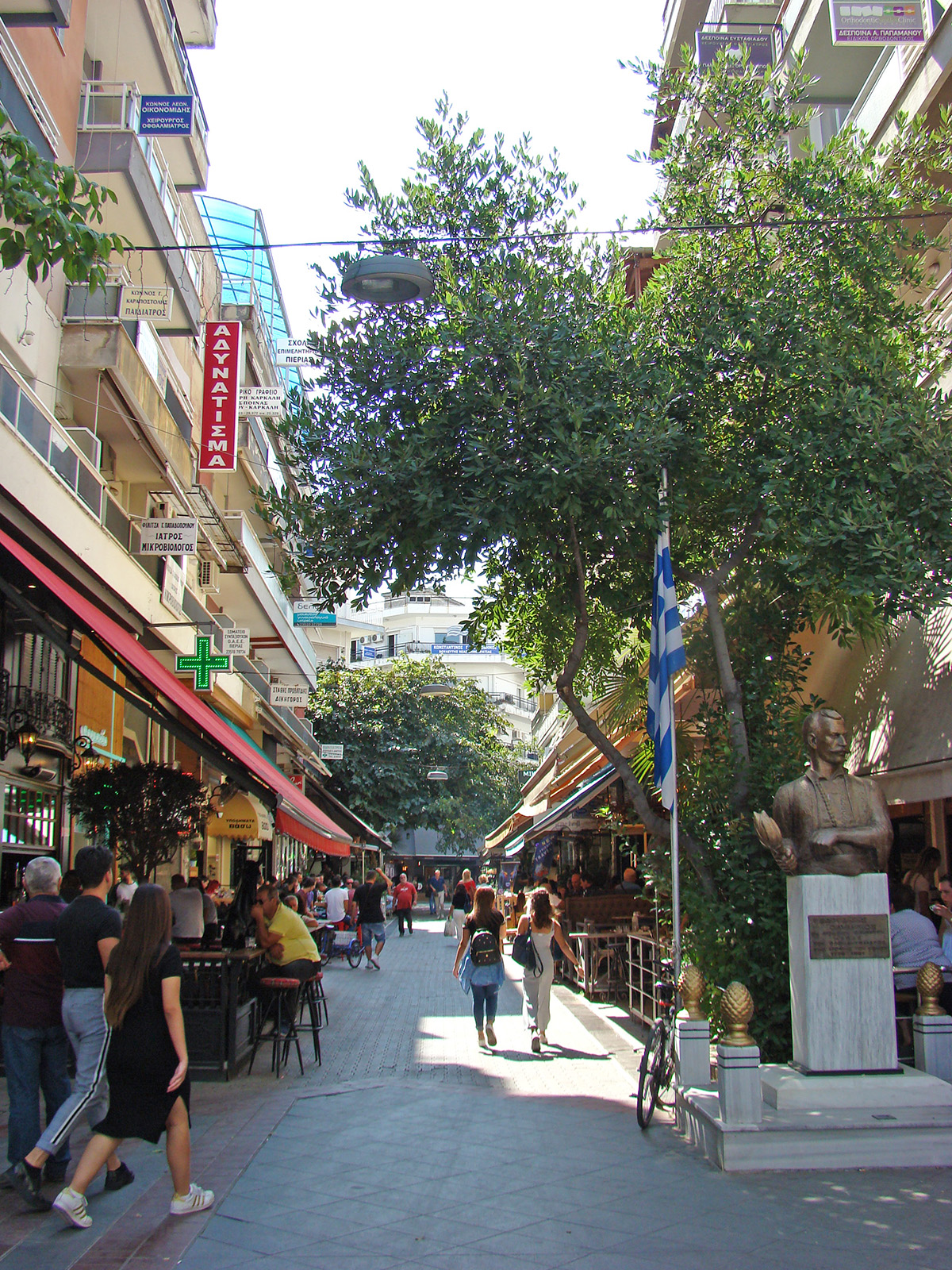
Giorgakis Olympios bust statue at the Giorgakis Olympios Street

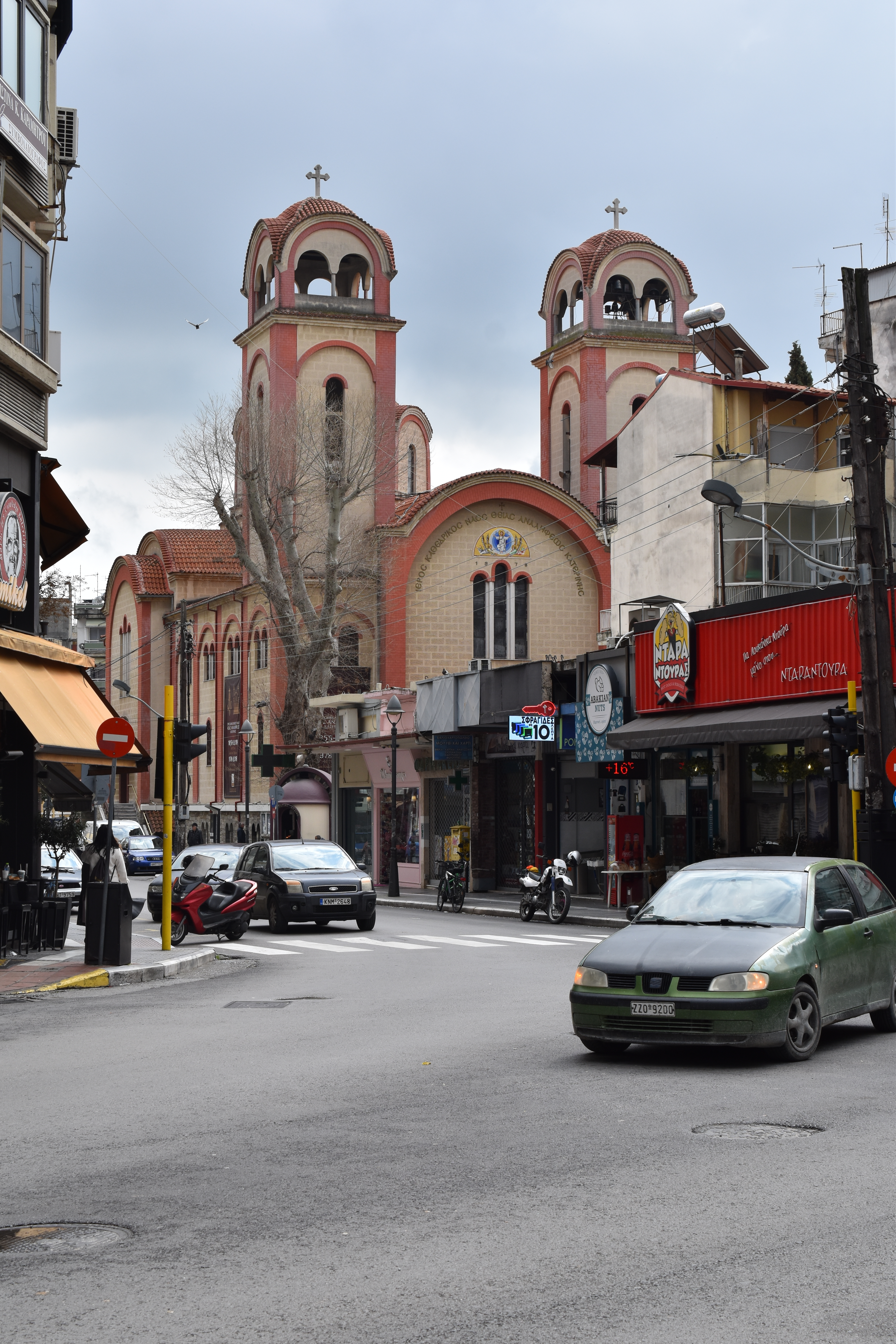
Cathedral Church of the Holy Ascension

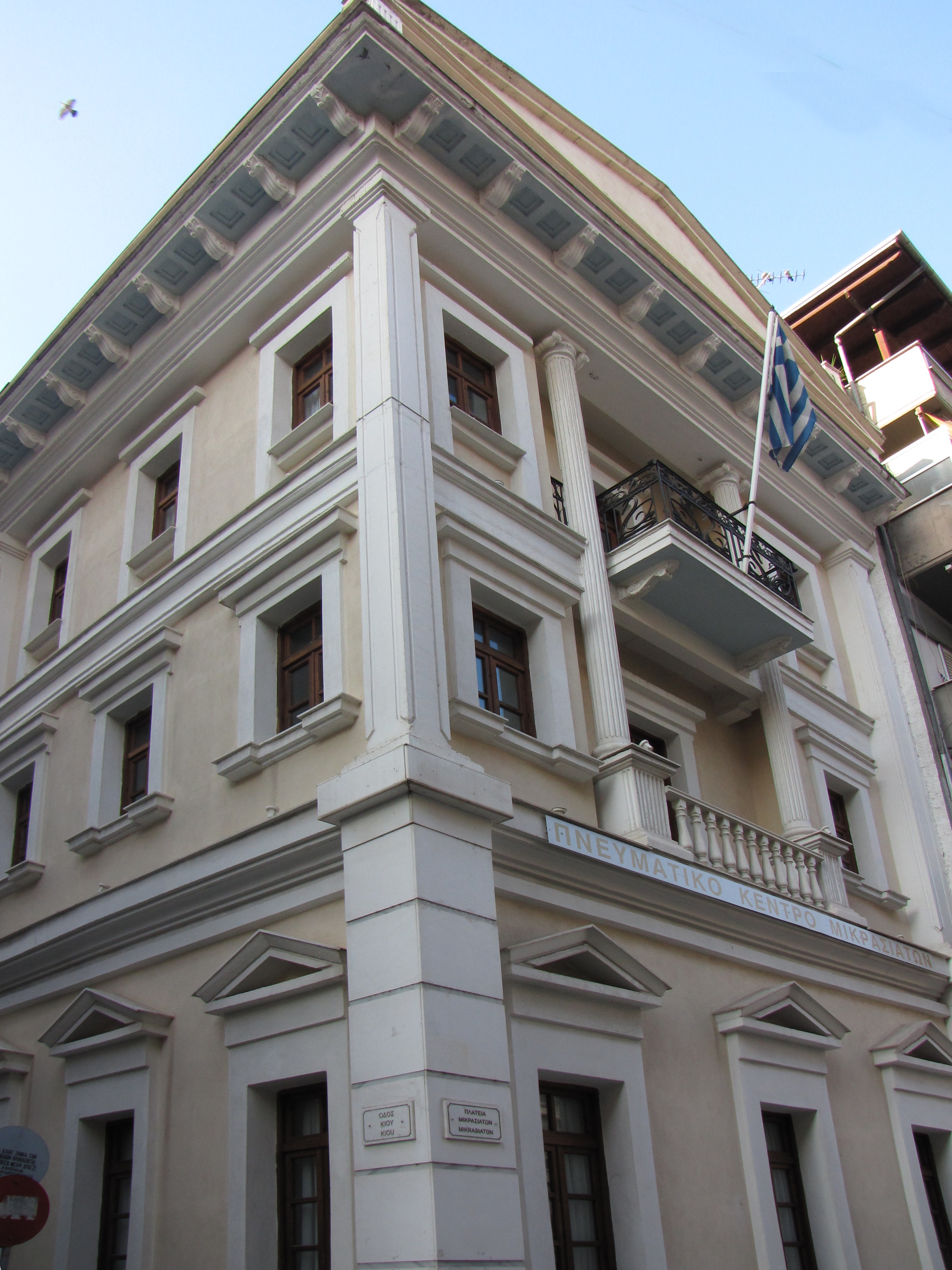
Association of Asia Minor of Pieria

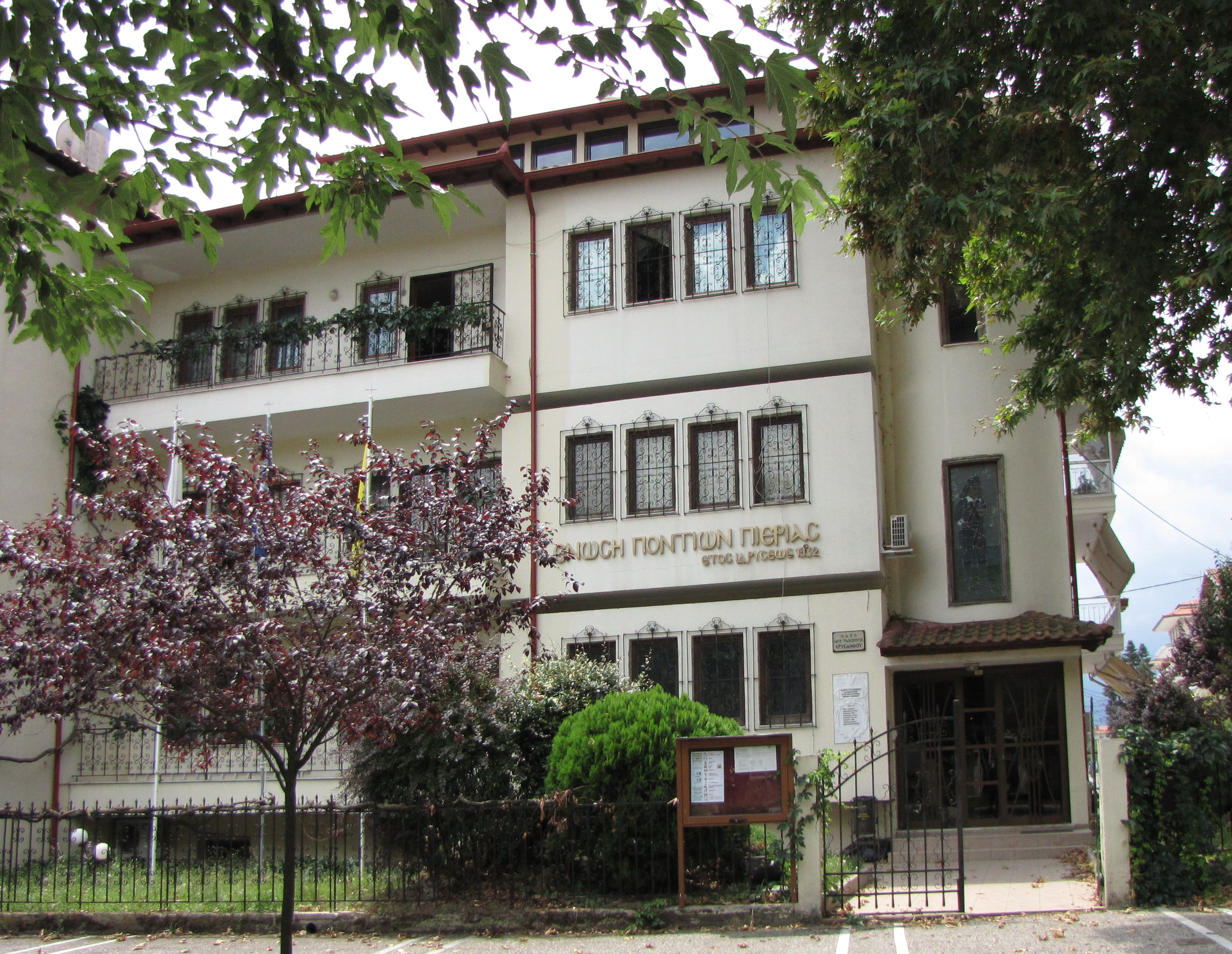
Union of Pontians of Pieria

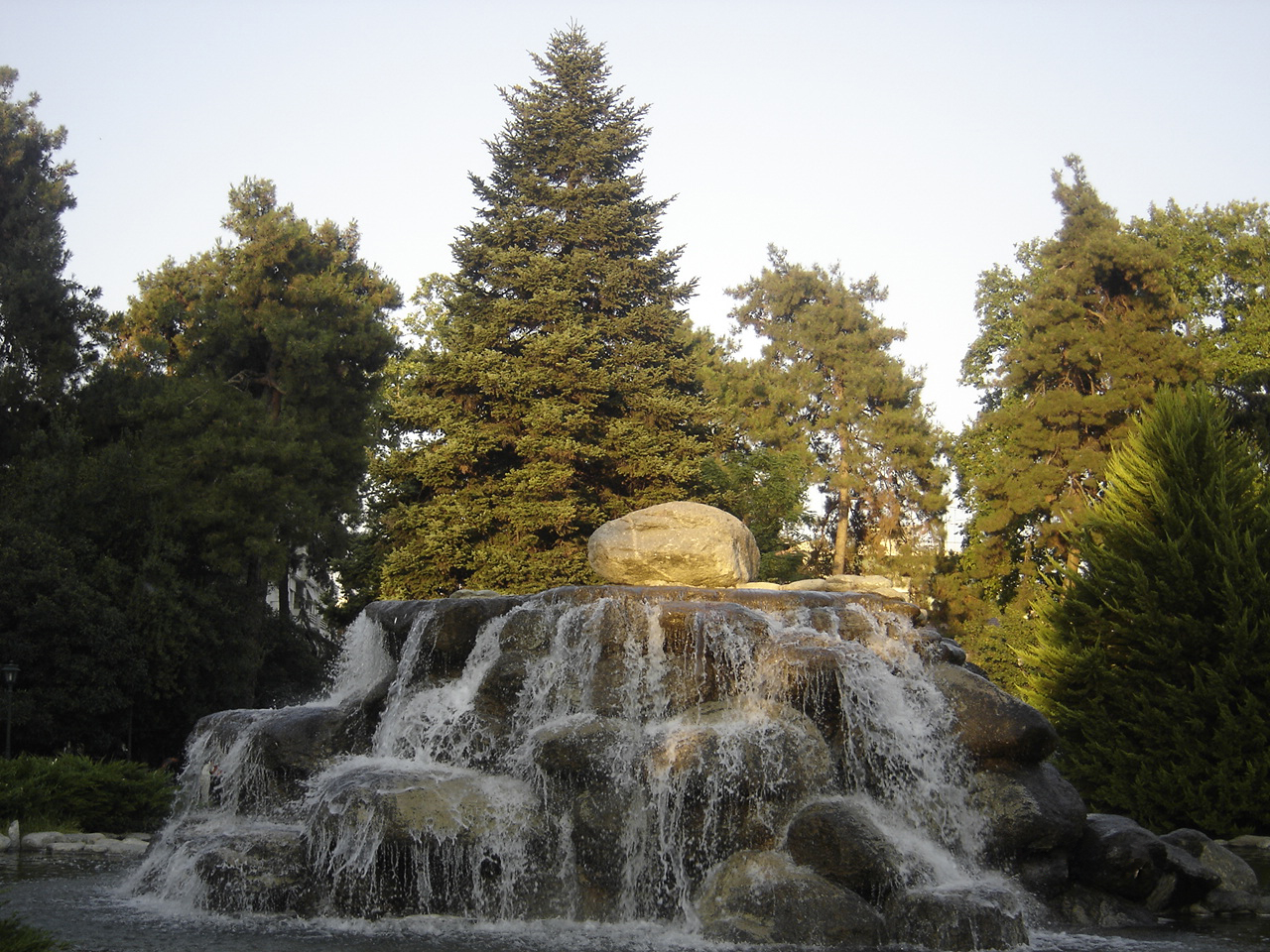
Municipal Park

== See also ==
- List of settlements in Piera
- History of Pieria
