= RCH (cars) =

Replica automobile manufacturer

Replicar Hellas
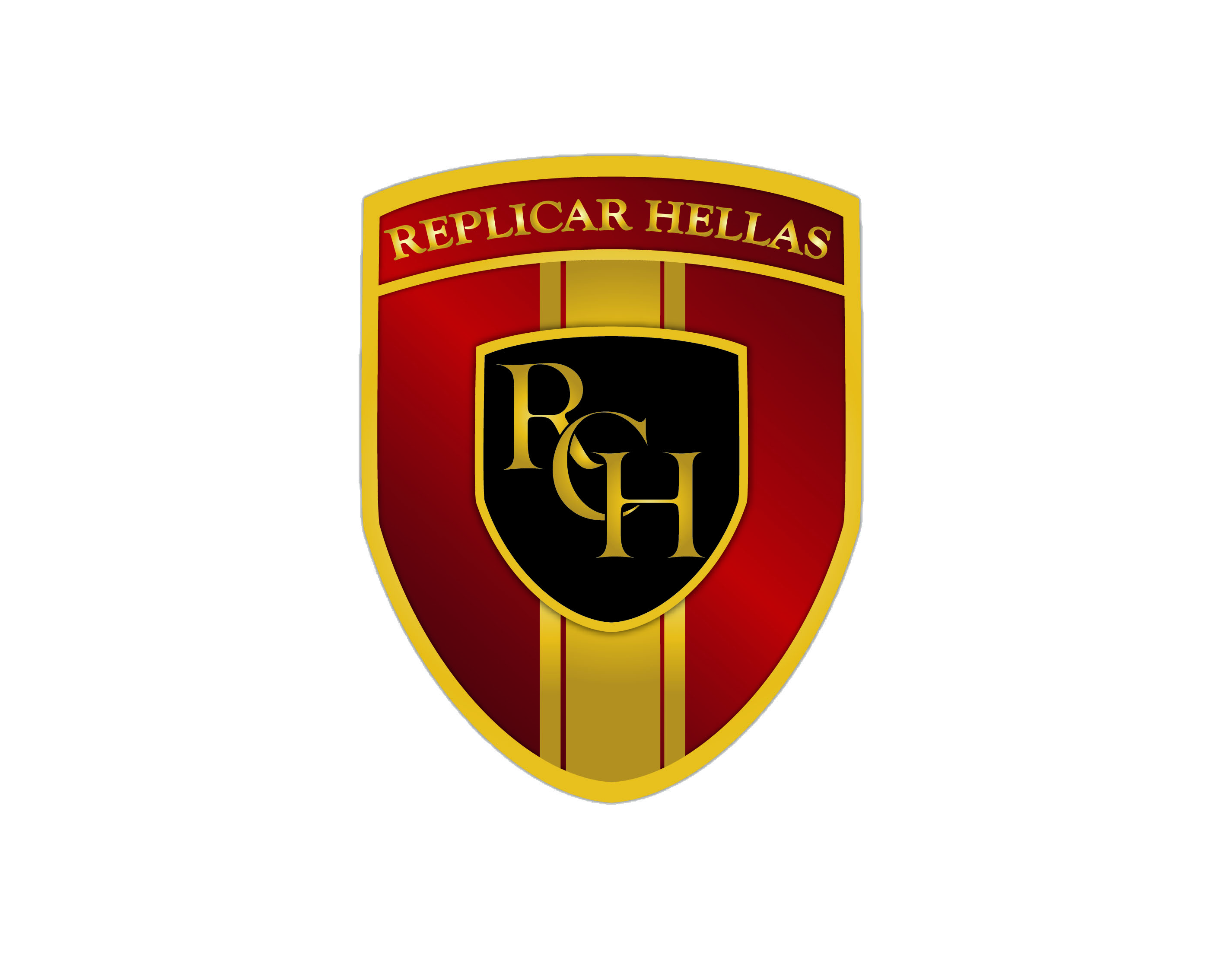
- Company type: Replica manufacturer
- Founded: 2007; 19 years ago in Katerini, Greece
- Founder: Elias Gaganelis
- Headquarters: Katerini, Greece
- Products: Automobile replicas
- Website: replicarhellas.com

RCH (Replicar Hellas, formerly Beetlekitcars) was founded in 2007 in Katerini, Greece, by Elias Gaganelis, and produces high-quality replicas, mostly of older Porsche models. These include a variety of types based on the 356 Speedster, as well as the 550 Spyder, while models based on the Volkswagen Beetle have also been produced. For several years, the cars could not be legally sold in Greece, with all produced cars exported, mostly to European countries (sales in Greece were only allowed since 2014). In late 2016 the company introduced a Beach Buggy model of its own development.

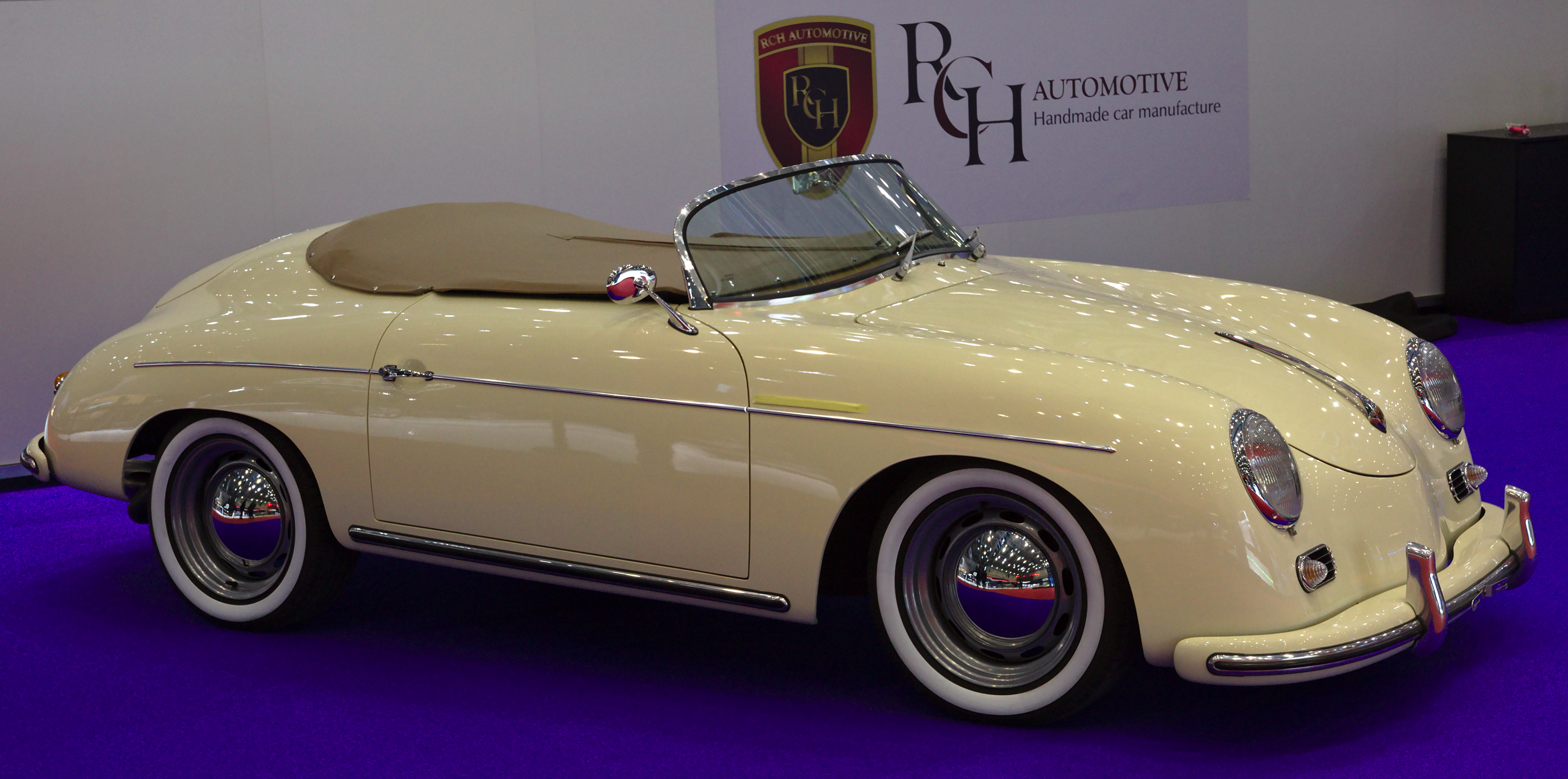
RCH 356 GT Replica at Geneva Motor Show 2019

== Gallery ==
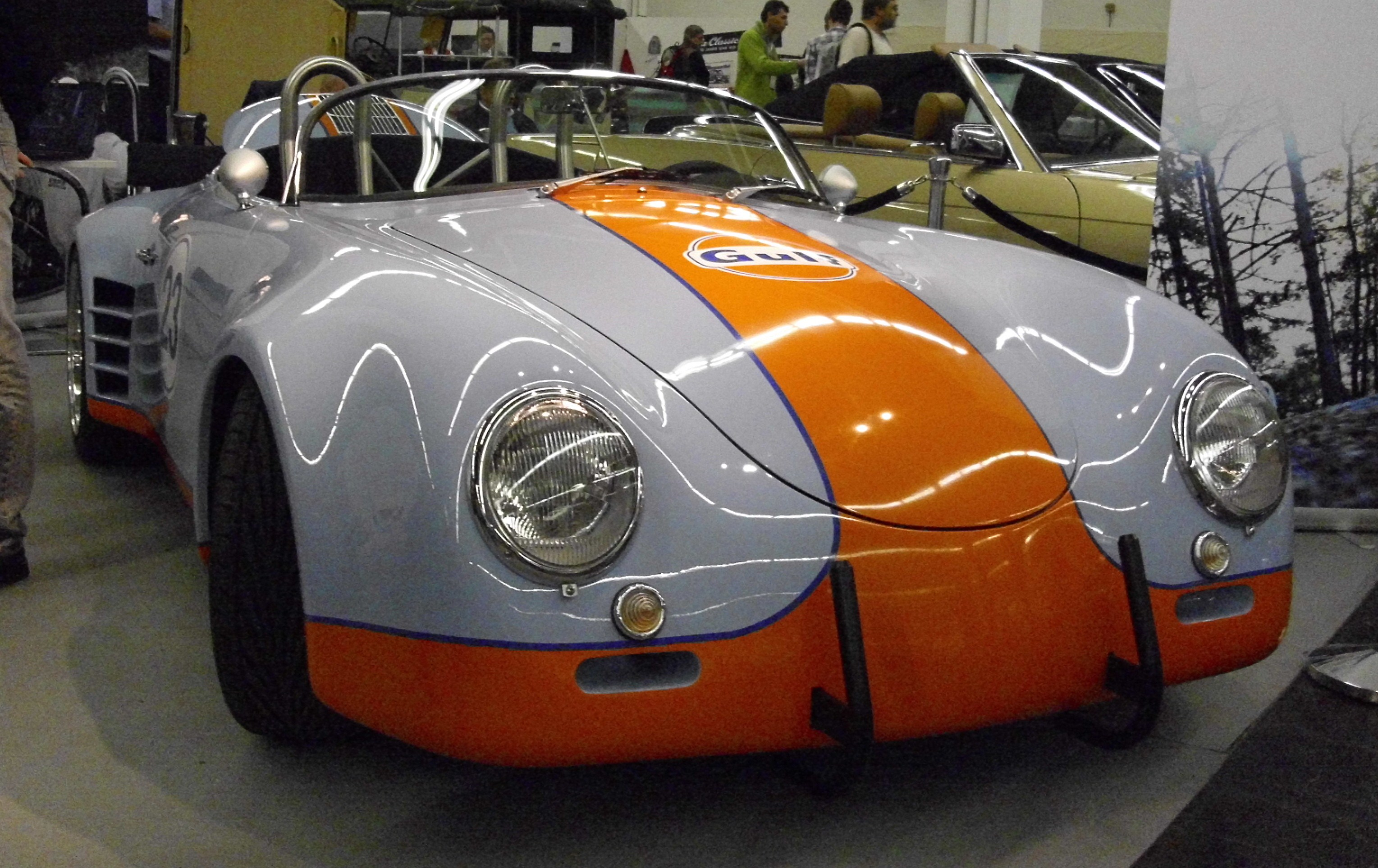

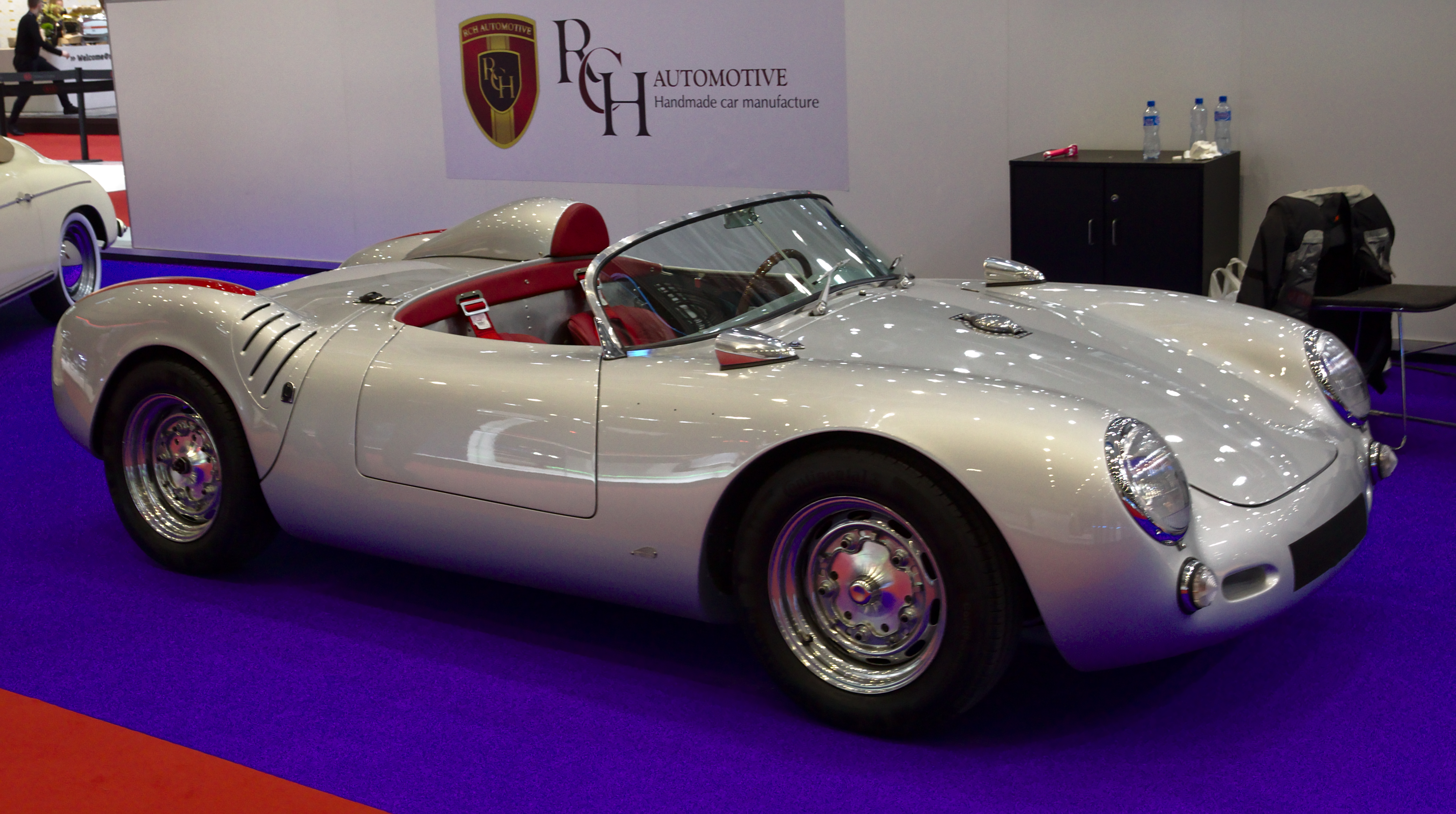

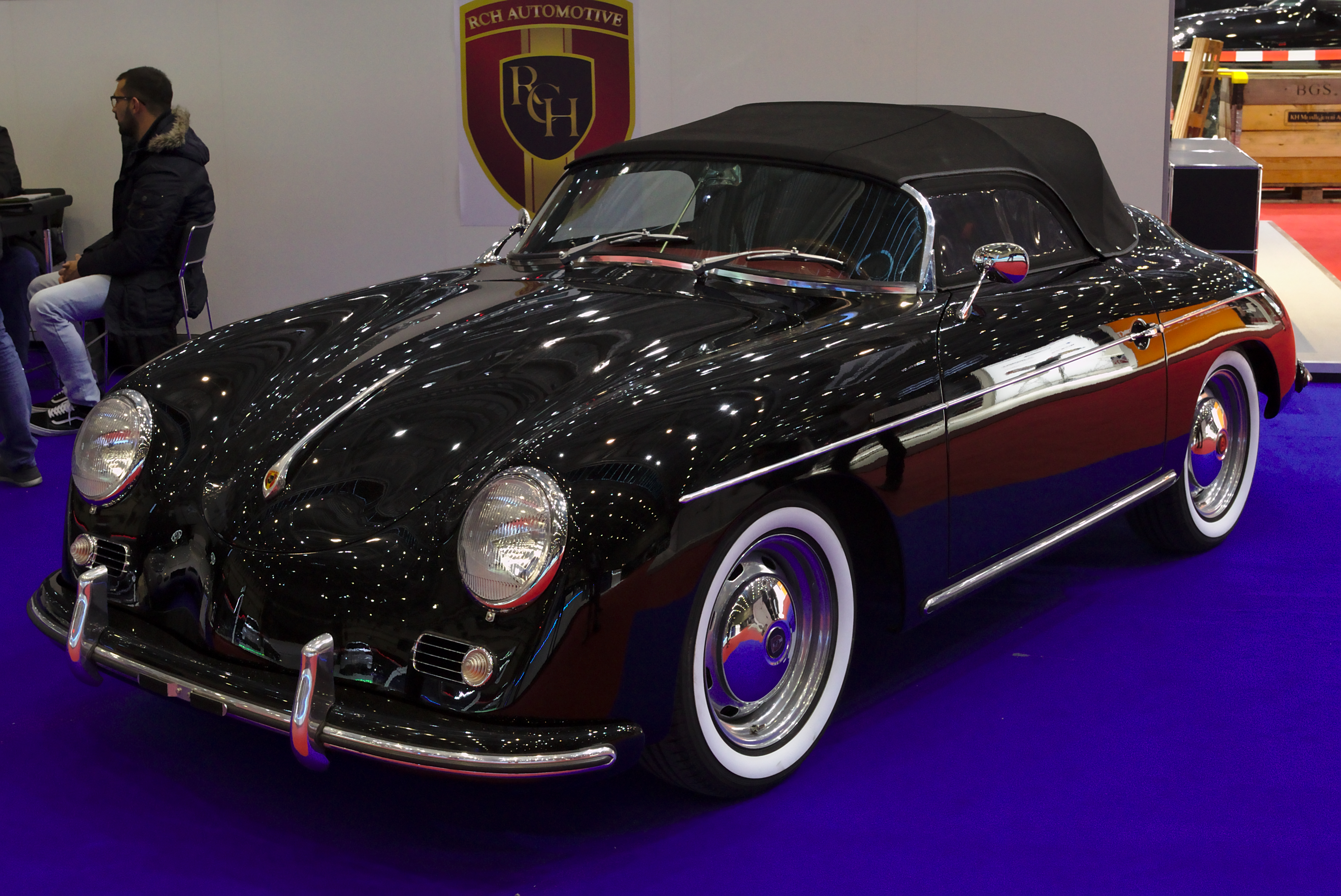

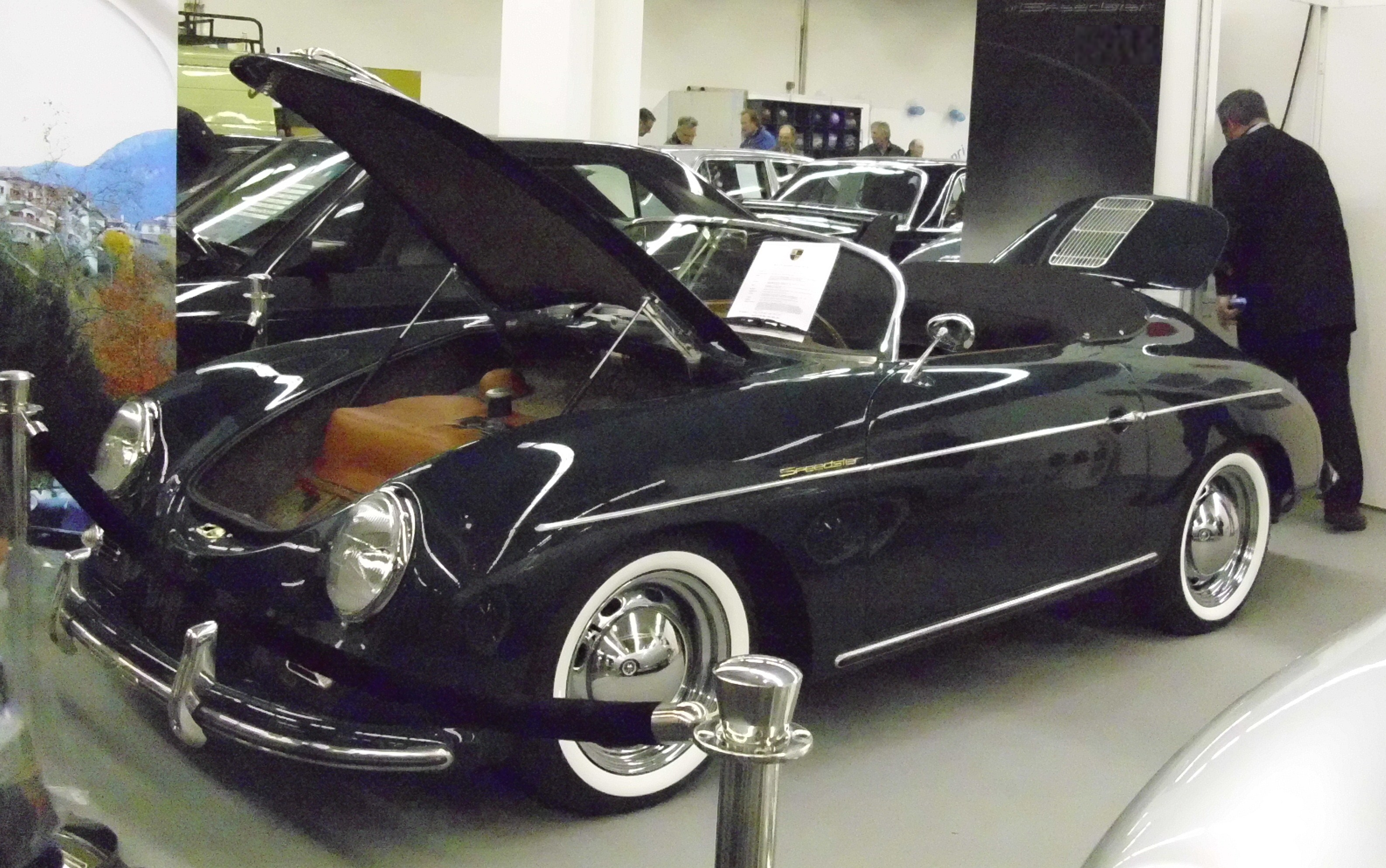

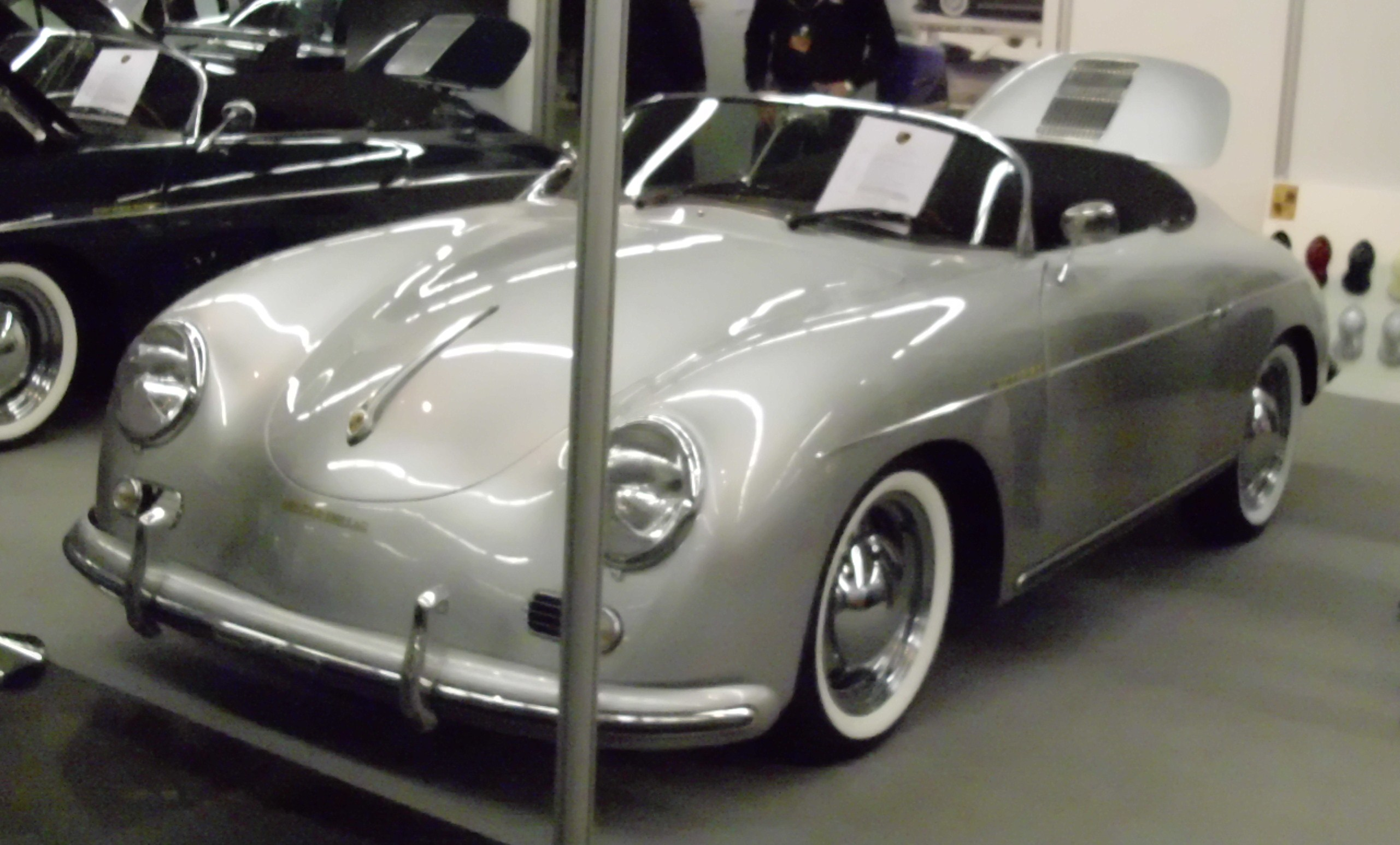
