= Ano Agios Ioannis =

Ano Agios Ioannis Άνω Άγιος Ιωάννης
- Community
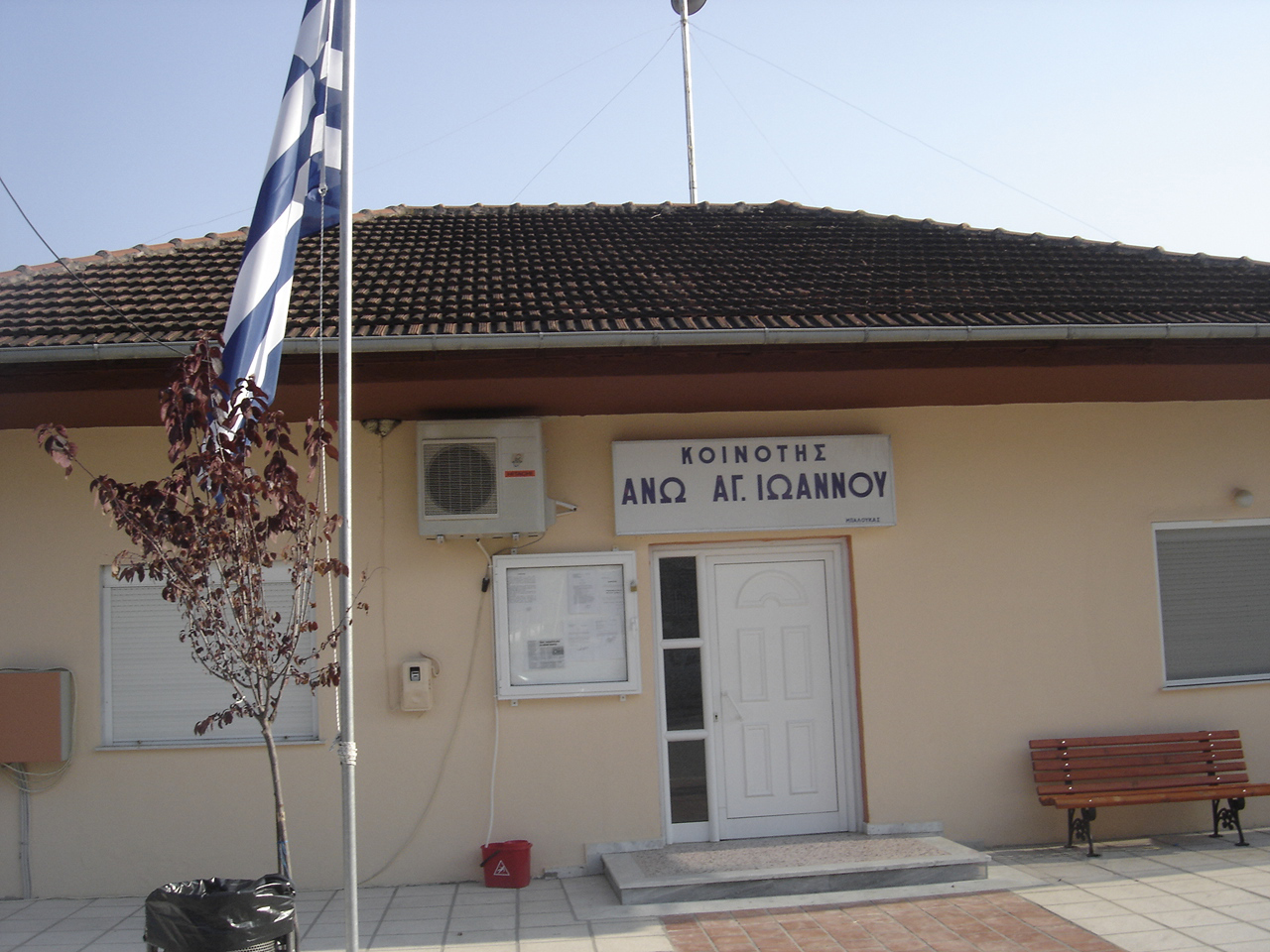
- The community hall of Ano Agios Ioannis

- Location within Greece
- Coordinates: 40°19′N 22°29.5′E
- Country: Greece
- Administrative region: Central Macedonia
- Regional unit: Pieria
- Municipality: Katerini
- Municipal unit: Katerini
- Elevation: 80 m (260 ft)

Population (2021)
  - Community: 496
- Time zone: UTC+2 (EET)
  - Summer (DST): UTC+3 (EEST)
- Postal code: 601 50
- Area code: +30-2351
- Vehicle registration: KN

Ano Agios Ioannis (Greek: Άνω Άγιος Ιωάννης) is a village and a community of the Katerini municipality. Before the 2011 local government reform it was part of the municipality of Katerini, of which it was a municipal district. The 2021 census recorded 496 residents.

== See also ==
- List of settlements in the Pieria regional unit
