= Paralia Katerinis =

Village in Pieria, Greece

Paralia Παραλία
- Municipal unit
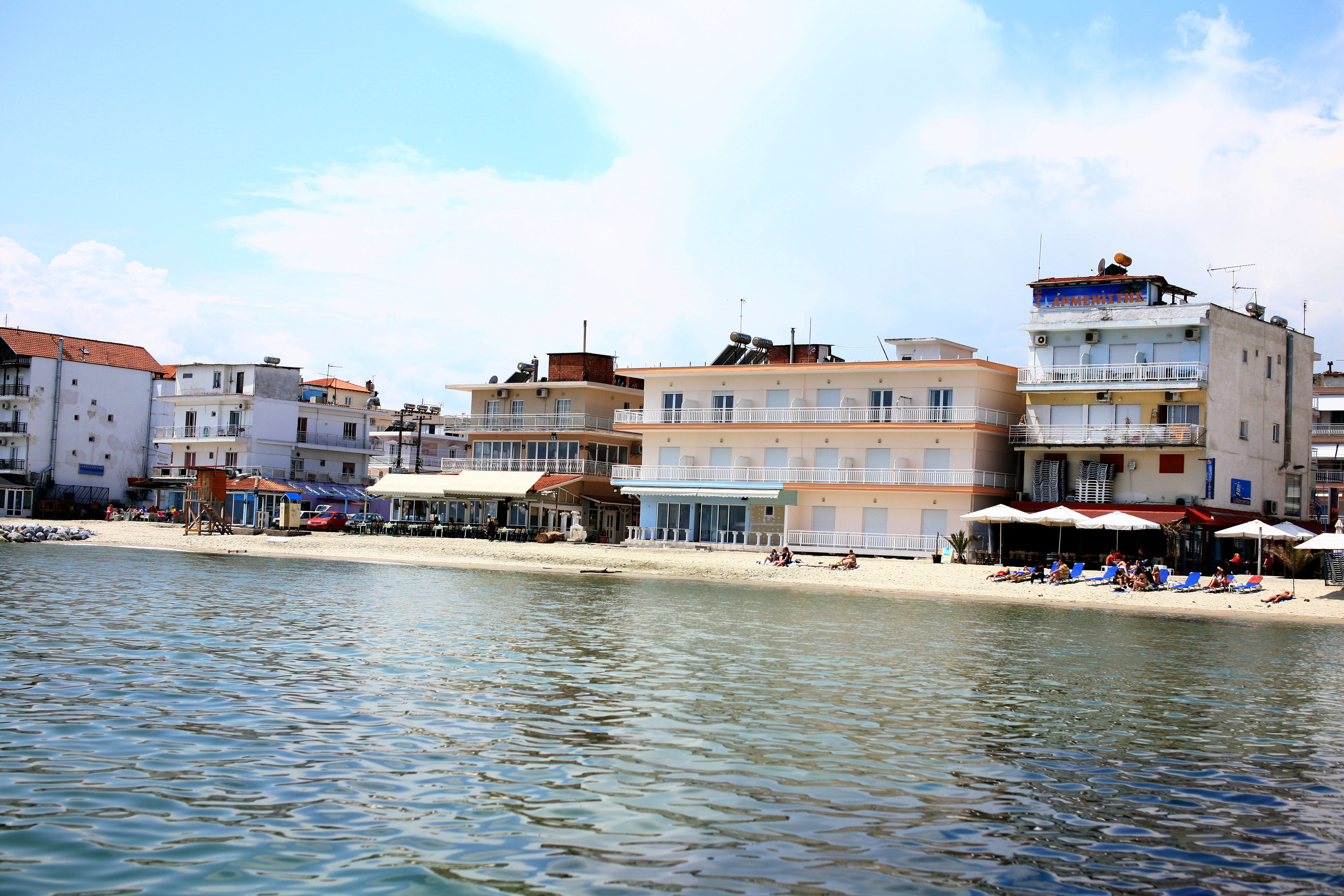

- Location within the regional unit

- Location within Greece
- Coordinates: 40°16′N 22°35′E
- Country: Greece
- Administrative region: Central Macedonia
- Regional unit: Pieria
- Municipality: Katerini
- Village established: 1922 (104 years ago)

Area
  - Municipal unit: 24.344 km^{2} (9.399 sq mi)
  - Community: 1.849 km^{2} (0.714 sq mi)
- Elevation: 14 m (46 ft)

Population (2021)
  - Municipal unit: 6,228
  - Municipal unit density: 255.8/km^{2} (662.6/sq mi)
  - Community: 928
  - Community density: 502/km^{2} (1,300/sq mi)
- Time zone: UTC+2 (EET)
  - Summer (DST): UTC+3 (EEST)
- Postal code: 601 50
- Area code: 23510
- Vehicle registration: KN

Paralia (Greek: Παραλία, Paralía, meaning "beach") is a tourist seaside settlement and a former municipality in the eastern part of the Pieria regional unit, Greece. Since the 2011 local government reform it is part of the municipality Katerini, of which it is a municipal unit. The seat of the municipality was in Kallithea. The 2021 census reported a population of 928 for the community of Paralia, and 6,228 for the municipal unit. The municipal unit has an area of 24.344 km^{2}, the community 1.849 km^{2}. Paralia Katerinis actually translated "Beach of Katerini" and is the closest beach to the capital city of Katerini.

== Historical data ==
The settlement was founded by fishermen after 1922. Its inhabitants were refugees from Cius in Asia Minor. At first, they settled in Thessaloniki. Some of them left and went to Davlia where the inhabitants welcomed them. They made a living from agriculture and fruit farming. After living there for a while, they decided to leave, some to the north and some to the south. Those who moved north arrived at Paralia in the Municipality of Paralia and settled in because the area reminded them of their place.

Paralia's previous name was Vromeroskala (Βρωμερόσκαλα).

== Geography ==
Paralia is situated on the west coast of the Thermaic Gulf. It lies 2 km east of Kallithea, 5 km south of Korinos and 8 km east of Katerini's city centre. The A1 motorway (served by Katerini's North & South Interchanges) and the Piraeus–Platy railway (served by Katerini RR station) pass west of the settlement. Paralia has a fishing port and the Hellenic Coast Guard Katerini's department.

== Historical population ==
Year	Population
1991	3,100
2001	6,449
2011	6,803
2021	6,228

== Gallery ==
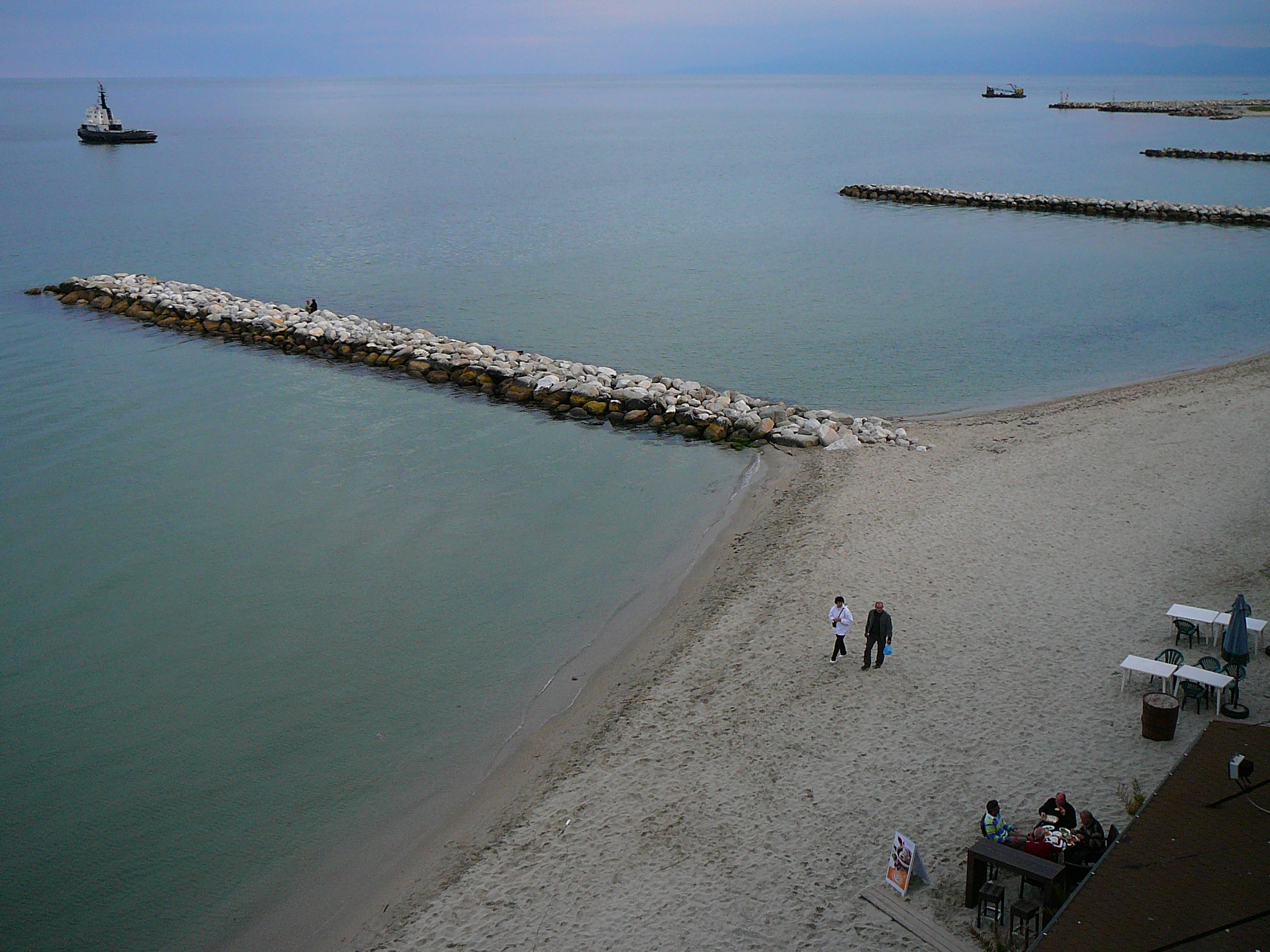

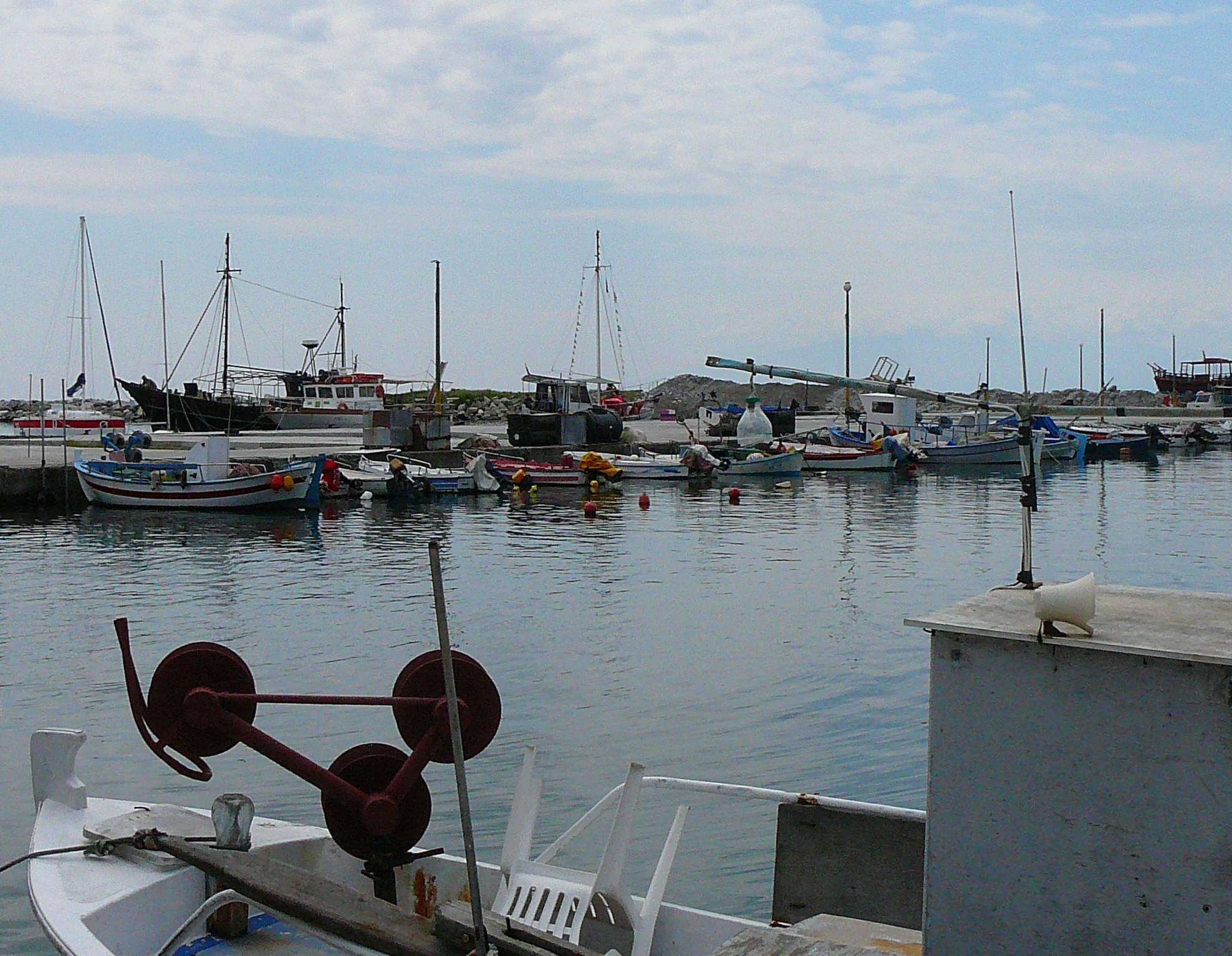

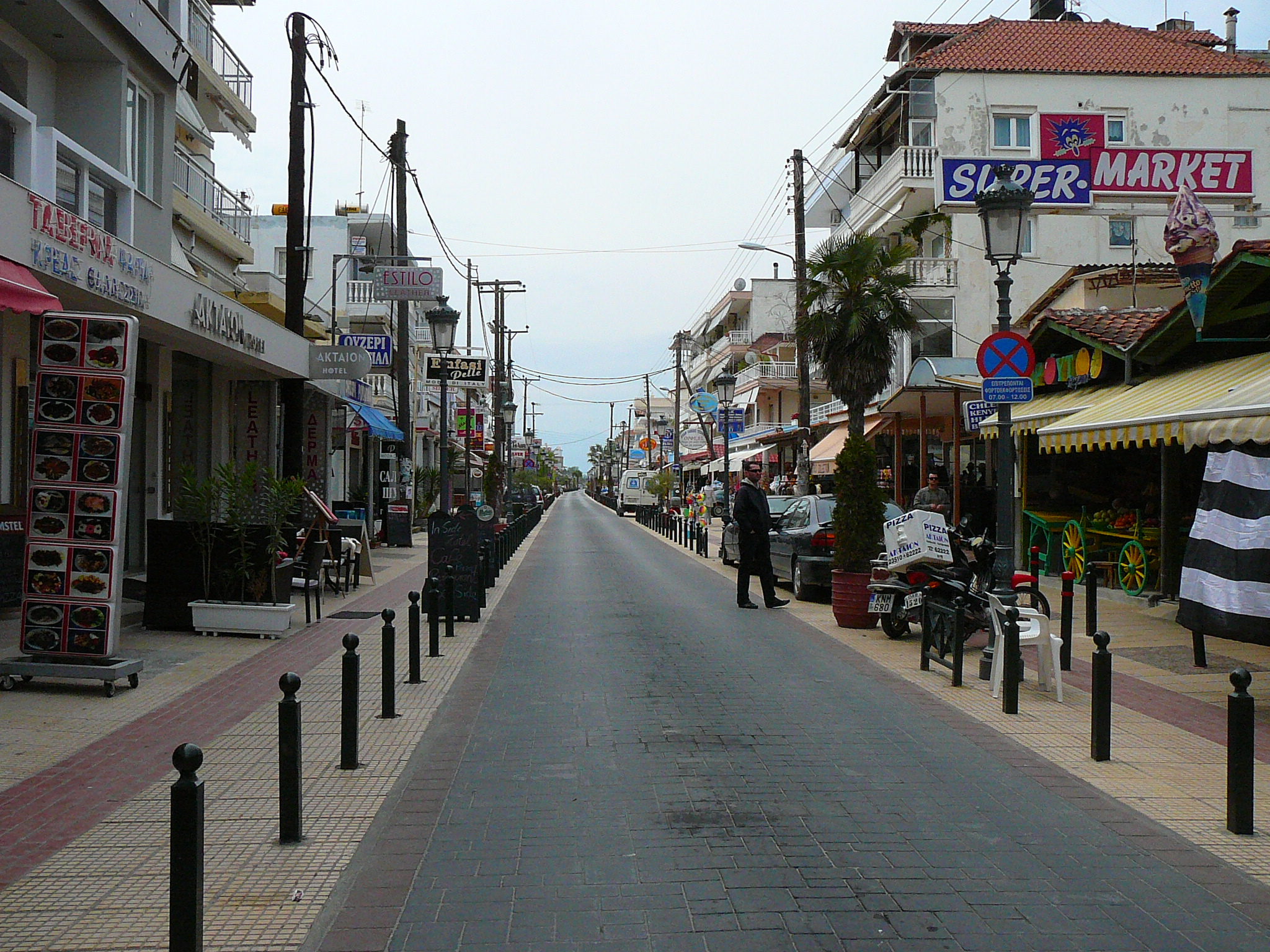

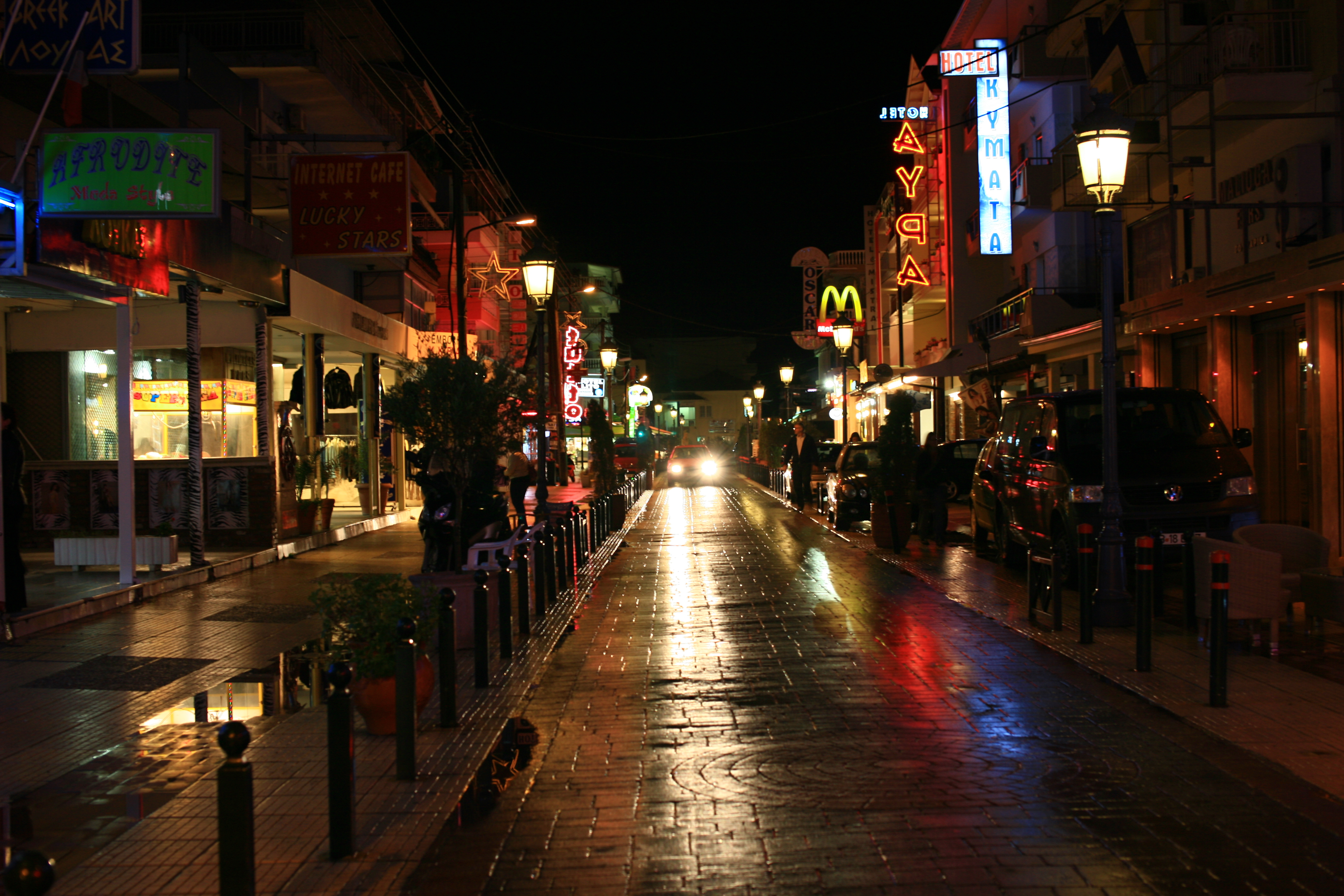

== See also ==
- List of settlements in the Pieria regional unit
