= List of former toponyms in Pieria Prefecture =

Many inhabited places in Pieria Prefecture of Greece have both Slavic and Greek forms. Some of the forms are identifiably of Greek origin, others of Slavic, yet others of Turkish or more obscure origins.

Slavic name(s)	Current official name other Greek names	Prefecture	Geographic Coordinates	Citation	Population (2001)	Other
Gorna Milea (Горна Милеа)	Ano Milia, Ano Milea (Άνω Μηλιά, Άνω Μηλέα)	Pieria	40°15′N 22°16′E	p. 268		
Arbauti (Арбаути)	Sevasti (Σεβαστή)	Pieria	40°21′N 22°33′E	p. 269	736	
Buragja (Бураѓа)	Meliadi (Μελιάδιον)	Pieria	40°20′N 22°21′E	p. 269	214	
Vrijaza (Вријаза)	Vria (Βρία)	Pieria	40°16′N 22°17′E	p. 269	422	
Vromeri (Вромери)	Kallithea (Καλλιθέα)	Pieria	40°16′N 22°35′E	p. 270	2,741	
Vromoskala (Вромоскала)	Paralia (Παραλία)	Pieria	40°16′N 22°36′E	p. 270	1,476	
Vrondu (Вронду)	Vrontou (Βροντού)	Pieria	40°11′N 22°26′E	p. 270	2,081	
Vulchishta, V'lchishta, Volchishta (Вулчишта, В'лчишта, Волчишта)	Livadi, Voultista (Λιβάδιον, Βούλτιστα)	Pieria	40°30′N 22°27′E	p. 270	307	
Desetti Kilometar (Декатон Хилјометрон, Десетти Километар)	Moschochori, Dekaton Chiliometron (Μοσχοχώρι, Μοσχοχώριον, Δέκατον Χιλιόμετρον)	Pieria	40°16′N 22°24′E	p. 271	500	
Drijanitsa (Дријаница)	Moschopotamos (Μοσχοπόταμος)	Pieria	40°20′N 22°19′E	p. 271	809	
Zjazjakon (Зјазјакон)	Lofos (Λόφος)	Pieria	40°14′N 22°23′E	p. 271	1,726	
Izvor (Извор)	Isvoros (Ίσβορος)	Pieria	40°22′N 22°22′E	p. 271		
Kalivija Baratinitsis, Kolibi na Bratinitsa (Каливија Баратиницис, Колиби на Братиница)	Exochi, Kalyvia Charadras (Εξοχή, Καλύβια Χαράδρας)	Pieria	40°21′N 22°26′E	p. 271	518	
Kolibi na Variku (Колиби на Варику)	Kalyvia Varikou (Καλύβια Βαρικού)	Pieria	40°11′N 22°34′E	p. 272	38	
Kolibi na Drimitsa (Колиби на Дримица)	Kalyvia Drimitsa (Καλύβια Δριμήτσα)	Pieria	40°16′N 22°25′E	p. 272		
Kolibi na Kontariotisa (Колиби на Контариотиса)	Agios Spyridonas, Kalyvia Kontariotissis (Άγιος Σπυρίδων, Καλύβια Κονταριωτίσσης)	Pieria	40°12′N 22°27′E	p. 272	1,558	
Kolibi na Maltrja (Колиби на Малтрја)	Agia Paraskevi, Kalyvia Malathrias (Αγία Παρασκευή, Καλύβια Μαλαθριάς)	Pieria	40°10′N 22°29′E	p. 272		
Kalivija na Elafinis, Kolibi na Elafina, Kolibi na Sportlita (Каливија на Елафинис, Колиби на Елафина, Колиби на Спортлита)	Elafos, Kalyvia, Kalyvia Elafinis, Kalyvia Sporlita (Έλαφος, Καλύβια, Καλύβια Ελαφίνης, Καλύβια Σπορλίτα)	Pieria	40°22′N 22°24′E	p. 272	626	
Karje (Карје)	Karyes (Καρυές, Καρυαί)	Pieria	40°14′N 22°18′E	p. 273	222	
Kastanja (Кастања)	Kastania (Καστανέα)	Pieria	40°27′N 22°27′E	p. 273	423	
Katerina (Катерина)	Katerini (Κατερίνη)	Pieria	40°16′N 22°31′E	p. 274	50,510	Capital of the prefecture
Dolna Milea (Долна Милеа)	Kato Milia (Κάτω Μηλιά)	Pieria	40°15′N 22°21′E	p. 274	997	
Keramidi (Керамиди)	Palaio Keramidi (Παλαιόν Κεραμίδιον)	Pieria	40°19′N 22°28′E	p. 274	731	
Kolokurion (Колокурион)	Svoronos (Σβορώνος)	Pieria	40°16′N 22°28′E	p. 275	1,931	
Kunturjotisa (Кунтурјотиса)	Kontariotissa (Κονταριώτισσα)	Pieria	40°14′N 22°28′E	p. 275	1,980	
Kursova, Bejlik (Курсова, Бејлик)	Toxo (Τόξον)	Pieria	40°20′N 22°24′E	p. 276	228	
Libanovo (Либаново)	Aiginio (Αιγίνιο, Αιγίνιον)	Pieria	40°29′N 22°33′E	p. 276	4,280	
Lokova, Lokovo (Локова, Локово)	Petra (Πέτρα)	Pieria	40°11′N 22°20′E	p. 277	120	
Londzhino, Londzhijano (Лонџино, Лонџијано)	Paliampela (Παλιάμπελα)	Pieria	40°30′N 22°30′E	p. 277	266	
Malatrja (Малатрја)	Dion (Δίον)	Pieria	40°11′N 22°30′E	p. 278	1,336	
Manastir Sveti Dionisij (Манастир Свети Дионисиј)	Agios Dionisios Monastery (Μονή Αγίου Διονυσίου)	Pieria	40°05′N 22°26′E	p. 278	26	
Mergjana (Мерѓана)	Meriana (Μεριάνα)	Pieria	40°20′N 22°20′E	p. 279		
Milja (Милја)	Milia (Μηλιά)	Pieria	40°15′N 22°18′E	p. 279	429	
Milovo, Miletovo (Милово, Милетово)	Megali Gefyra (Μεγάλη Γέφυρα)	Pieria	40°32′N 22°32′E	p. 279	268	
Morna (Морна)	Skotina (Σκοτεινά)	Pieria	40°12′N 22°15′E	p. 280	47	
Murdzhani (Мурџани)	Palaiometochon (Παλαιομέτοχον)	Pieria	40°23′N 22°24′E	p. 280		
Nea Kesarija (Неа Кесарија)	Neokaisareia (Νεοκαισάρεια)	Pieria	40°16′N 22°26′E	p. 280	379	
Nova Purlija (Нова Пурлија)	Neoi Poroi (Νέοι Πόροι)	Pieria	39°58′N 22°39′E	p. 281	691	
Paleonestani (Палеонестани)	Palaiostani (Παλαιοστάνη, Παλαιόστανη)	Pieria	40°25′N 22°28′E	p. 282	564	
Paljani (Палјани)	Sfendami (Σφενδάμιο, Σφενδάμιον)	Pieria	40°25′N 22°33′E	p. 282	1,167	
Pidna (Пидна)	Kitros (Κίτρος)	Pieria	40°22′N 22°35′E	p. 283	1,506	
Pristanishte Litokhoro (Пристаниште Литохоро)	Limenas Litochorou (Λιμήν Λιτοχώρου)	Pieria	40°09′N 22°33′E	p. 284	38	
Purlija (Пурлија)	Poroi (Πόροι)	Pieria	39°58′N 22°36′E	p. 284	21	
Radjani (Радјани)	Ryakia (Ρυάκια)	Pieria	40°24′N 22°24′E	p. 284	598	
Rentini, Retina (Рентини, Ретина)	Ritini (Ρητίνη)	Pieria	40°17′N 22°17′E	p. 285	1,674	
Salonija (Салонија)	Alonia (Αλώνια)	Pieria	40°23′N 22°33′E	p. 285	700	
Salonija Kukos (Салонија Кукос)	Koukkos (Κούκκος)	Pieria	40°23′N 22°31′E	p. 285	523	
Skotina (Скотина)	Ano Skotina, Skotina (Άνω Σκοτίνα, Σκοτίνα)	Pieria	40°01′N 22°33′E	p. 286	0	
Skotinjotika (Скотињотика)	Skotina (Σκοτίνα)	Pieria	40°01′N 22°33′E	p. 286	957	
Skuterna (Скутерна)	Elatochori, Elatousa (Ελατοχώριον, Ελατούσα)	Pieria	40°19′N 22°15′E	p. 286	715	
Solana Pidna (Солана Пидна)	Alyki Kitros (Αλυκή Κίτρος)	Pieria	40°21′N 22°39′E	p. 287		
Spi (Спи)	Nea Efesos, Stoupion (Νέα Έφεσος, Στουπείον)	Pieria	40°14′N 22°30′E	p. 287	1,859	
Tokhova (Тохова)	Trilofos, Palaionelini (Τρίλοφος, Παλαιονέληνη)	Pieria	40°22′N 22°28′E	p. 287	620	
Tuzla (Тузла)	Alyki (Αλυκή)	Pieria	40°21′N 22°37′E	p. 287	50	
Turija, Turje (Турија, Турје)	Ganochora (Γανόχωρα)	Pieria	40°18′N 22°30′E	p. 288	667	
