= List of settlements in the Pieria regional unit =

This is a list of settlements in the Pieria regional unit, Greece.

- Agiannis
- Agia Varvara
- Agios Dimitrios, Katerini
- Agios Dimitrios, Dio-Olympos
- Agios Spyridonas
- Aiginio
- Alonia
- Alyki
- Andromachi
- Ano Agios Ioannis
- Ano Milia
- Aronas
- Dion
- Elafos
- Elatochori
- Exochi
- Foteina
- Fteri
- Ganochora
- Kallithea
- Kalyvia Varikou
- Karitsa
- Karyes
- Kastania
- Katachas
- Katalonia
- Katerini
- Kato Agios Ioannis
- Kato Milia
- Kitros
- Kolindros
- Kondariotissa
- Korinos
- Koukkos
- Lagorrachi
- Leptokarya
- Limenas Litochorou
- Litochoro
- Livadi
- Lofos
- Makrygialos
- Megali Gefyra
- Meliadi
- Mesaia Milia
- Methoni
- Mikri Milia
- Milia
- Moschochori
- Moschopotamos
- Nea Agathoupoli
- Nea Chrani
- Nea Efesos
- Nea Trapezounta
- Neo Keramidi
- Neoi Poroi
- Neos Panteleimonas
- Neokaisareia
- Olympiaki Akti
- Palaio Eleftherochori
- Palaio Keramidi
- Palaiostani
- Paliampela
- Plaka
- Palaios Panteleimonas
- Palioi Poroi
- Paralia
- Paralia Korinou
- Paralia Panteleimonos
- Paralia Skotinas
- Peristasi
- Platamon
- Platanakia
- Prosilio
- Pydna
- Rachi
- Ritini
- Ryakia
- Sevasti
- Sfendami
- Skoteina
- Skotina
- Svoronos
- Toxo
- Trilofos
- Vria
- Vrontou

== See also ==
- Slavic toponyms of places in Pieria Prefecture
- List of towns and villages in Greece
