= Nea Chrani =

Nea Chrani Νέα Χράνη
- Settlement
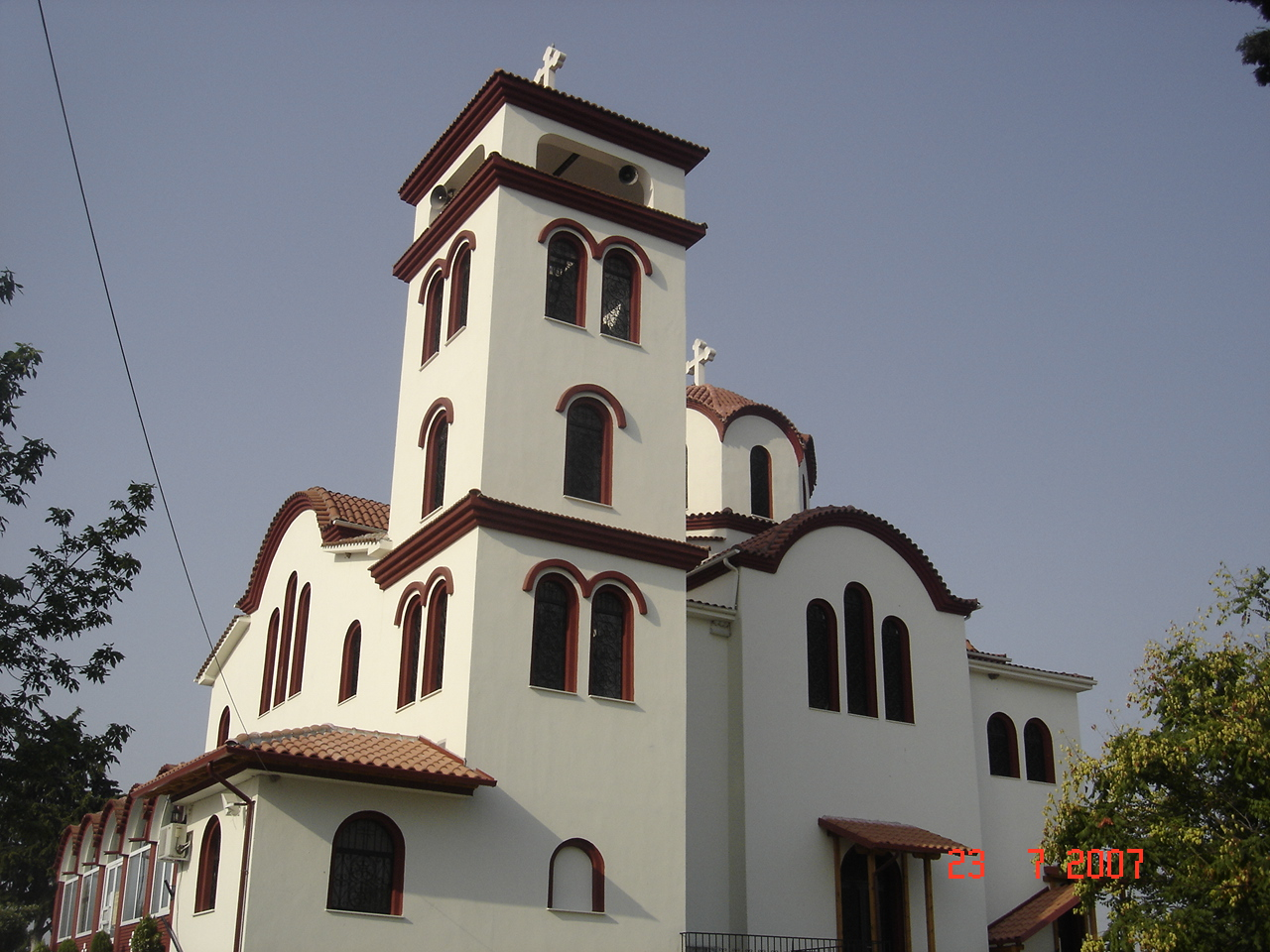
- The church of Nea Chrani

- Location within Greece
- Coordinates: 40°18.5′N 22°32.5′E
- Country: Greece
- Administrative region: Central Macedonia
- Regional unit: Pieria
- Municipality: Katerini
- Municipal unit: Katerini
- Community: Katerini
- Elevation: 40 m (130 ft)

Population (2021)
  - Total: 438
- Time zone: UTC+2 (EET)
  - Summer (DST): UTC+3 (EEST)
- Postal code: 601 50
- Area code: +30-2351
- Vehicle registration: KN

Nea Chrani (Greek: Νέα Χράνη) is a village of the Katerini municipality. Before 1991 it was part of the community of Kato Agios Ioannis. The 2021 census recorded 438 inhabitants in the village.

== See also ==
- List of settlements in the Pieria regional unit
