= Palaio Eleftherochori =

Palaio Eleftherochori Παλαιό Ελευθεροχώρι
- Community
- Location within Greece
- Coordinates: 40°26.25′N 22°34.5′E
- Country: Greece
- Administrative region: Central Macedonia
- Regional unit: Pieria
- Municipality: Pydna-Kolindros
- Municipal unit: Methoni
- Elevation: 130 m (430 ft)

Population (2021)
  - Community: 377
- Time zone: UTC+2 (EET)
  - Summer (DST): UTC+3 (EEST)
- Postal code: 600 66
- Area code: +30-2353
- Vehicle registration: KN

Palaio Eleftherochori (Greek: Παλαιό Ελευθεροχώρι) is a village in Pieria, Greece. Since the 2011 local government reform it is part of the municipality Pydna-Kolindros, of which it is a municipal community. The 2021 census recorded 377 residents in the village.

== See also ==
- List of settlements in the Pieria regional unit
