= Agiannis, Pieria =

Agiannis Αγιάννης
- Settlement
- Location within Greece
- Coordinates: 40°25.6′N 22°36.3′E
- Country: Greece
- Administrative region: Central Macedonia
- Regional unit: Pieria
- Municipality: Pydna-Kolindros
- Municipal unit: Methoni
- Community: Methoni
- Elevation: 20 m (66 ft)

Population (2021)
  - Total: 6
- Time zone: UTC+2 (EET)
  - Summer (DST): UTC+3 (EEST)
- Postal code: 600 66
- Area code: +30-2353
- Vehicle registration: KN

Agiannis (Greek: Αγιάννης) is a village of the municipality of Pydna-Kolindros. Before the 2011 local government reform it was part of the municipality of Methoni. The 2021 census recorded 6 inhabitants in the village. Agiannis is a part of the community of Methoni.

== See also ==
- List of settlements in the Pieria regional unit
