= Alonia =

Alonia may refer to:

- Alonia, Messenia, a village in the municipality Aris, Messenia, Greece
- Alonia, Pieria, a village in the municipality Pydna, Pieria, Greece
- Alonia, Zakynthos, a village in the municipality Alykes, Zakynthos, Greece
- Marki Alonia, an archaeological site in Cyprus
