= Andromachi =

Andromachi Ανδρομάχη
- Settlement
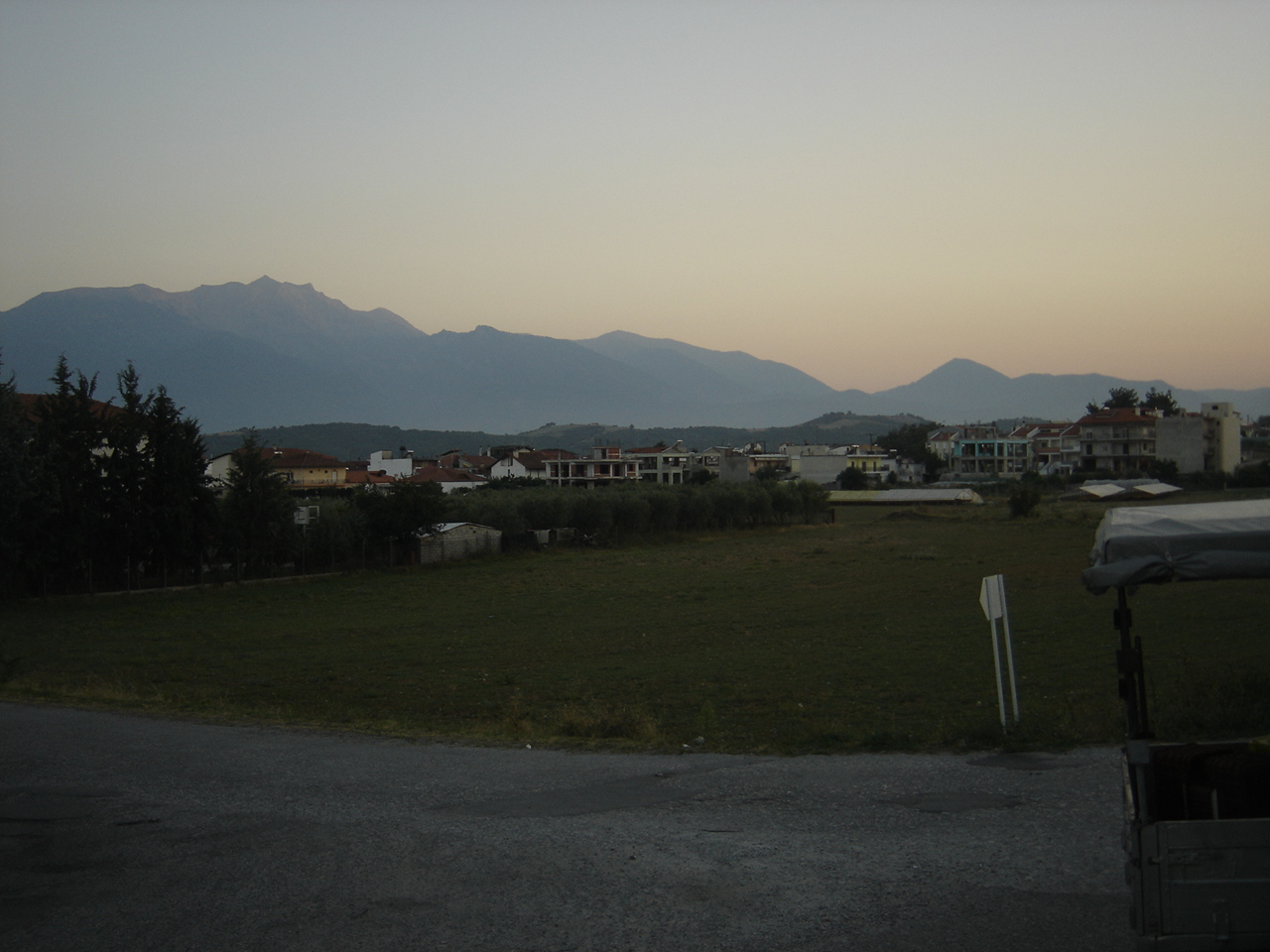
- View of Andromachi with Mount Olympus in the background

- Location within Greece
- Coordinates: 40°16.342′N 22°28.8675′E
- Country: Greece
- Administrative region: Central Macedonia
- Regional unit: Pieria
- Municipality: Katerini
- Municipal unit: Katerini
- Community: Katerini
- Elevation: 40 m (130 ft)

Population (2021)
  - Total: 1,043
- Time zone: UTC+2 (EET)
  - Summer (DST): UTC+3 (EEST)
- Postal code: 601 50
- Area code: +30-2351
- Vehicle registration: KN

Andromachi (Greek: Ανδρομάχη) is a district of the Katerini municipality in northern Greece. Before 1986 it was part of the community of Svoronos. The 2021 census recorded 1,043 inhabitants in the settlement, which is a part of the community of Katerini.

Andromachi is the only district of Katerini on the right bank of the river Pelekas.

== See also ==
- List of settlements in the Pieria regional unit
