= Moschopotamos =

Moschopotamos Μοσχοπόταμος
- Community
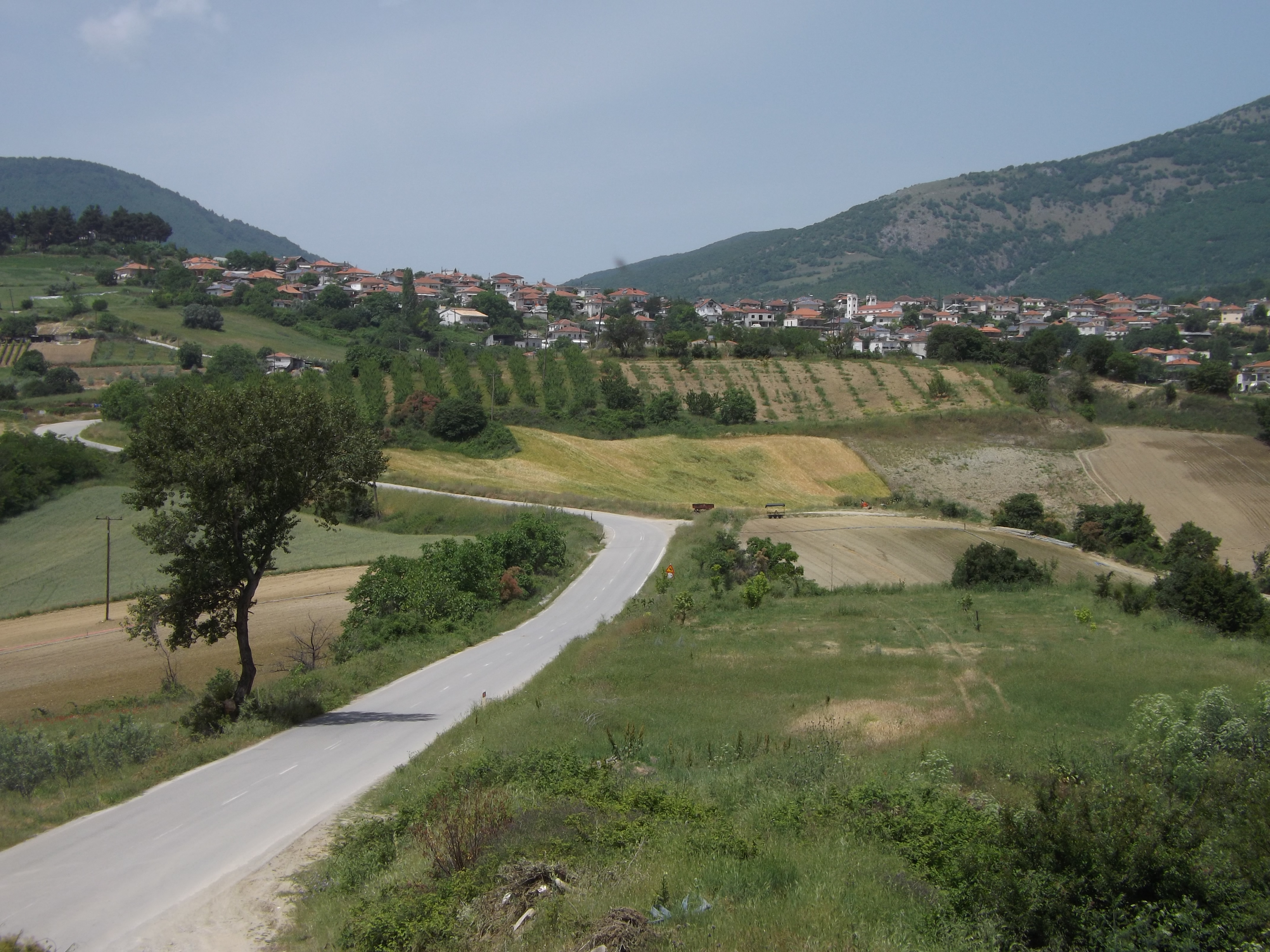
- View of Moschopotamos

- Location within Greece
- Coordinates: 40°19.5′N 22°18.5′E
- Country: Greece
- Administrative region: Central Macedonia
- Regional unit: Pieria
- Municipality: Katerini
- Municipal unit: Elafina

Area
  - Community: 13.606 km^{2} (5.253 sq mi)
- Elevation: 460 m (1,510 ft)

Population (2021)
  - Community: 457
  - Density: 33.6/km^{2} (87.0/sq mi)
- Time zone: UTC+2 (EET)
  - Summer (DST): UTC+3 (EEST)
- Postal code: 601 00
- Area code: +30-2351
- Vehicle registration: KN

Moschopotamos (Greek: Μοσχοπόταμος, Greek pronunciation: [mosxo'potamos]) is a village and a community of the Katerini municipality. Before the 2011 local government reform, it was part of the municipality of Elafina, which was a municipal district. The community of Moschopotamos covers an area of 13,606 km (8,454 mi).

== History ==
The village was named Dryanista (Greek: Δρυάνιστα, Greek pronunciation: [ðɾi'anista]) until 1926, when it was officially renamed to its current name.

== Population ==
Historical population
Year	Pop.	±%
2001	730	—
2011	543	−25.6%
2021	457	−15.8%

== See also ==
- List of settlements in the Pieria regional unit
