= Megali Gefyra =

Megali Gefyra Μεγάλη Γέφυρα
- Settlement
- Location within Greece
- Coordinates: 40°32′N 22°31.55′E
- Country: Greece
- Administrative region: Central Macedonia
- Regional unit: Pieria
- Municipality: Pydna-Kolindros
- Municipal unit: Aiginio
- Community: Aiginio
- Elevation: 30 m (98 ft)

Population (2021)
  - Total: 177
- Time zone: UTC+2 (EET)
  - Summer (DST): UTC+3 (EEST)
- Postal code: 600 61
- Area code: +30-2353
- Vehicle registration: KN

Megali Gefyra (Greek: Μεγάλη Γέφυρα, Bulgarian: Милово, Macedonian: Милово) is a village of the Pydna-Kolindros municipality. Before the 2011 local government reform it is part of the municipality of Aiginio. The 2021 census recorded 177 residents in the village.

== See also ==
- List of settlements in the Pieria regional unit
