= Alyki, Pieria =

Alyki Αλυκή
- Settlement
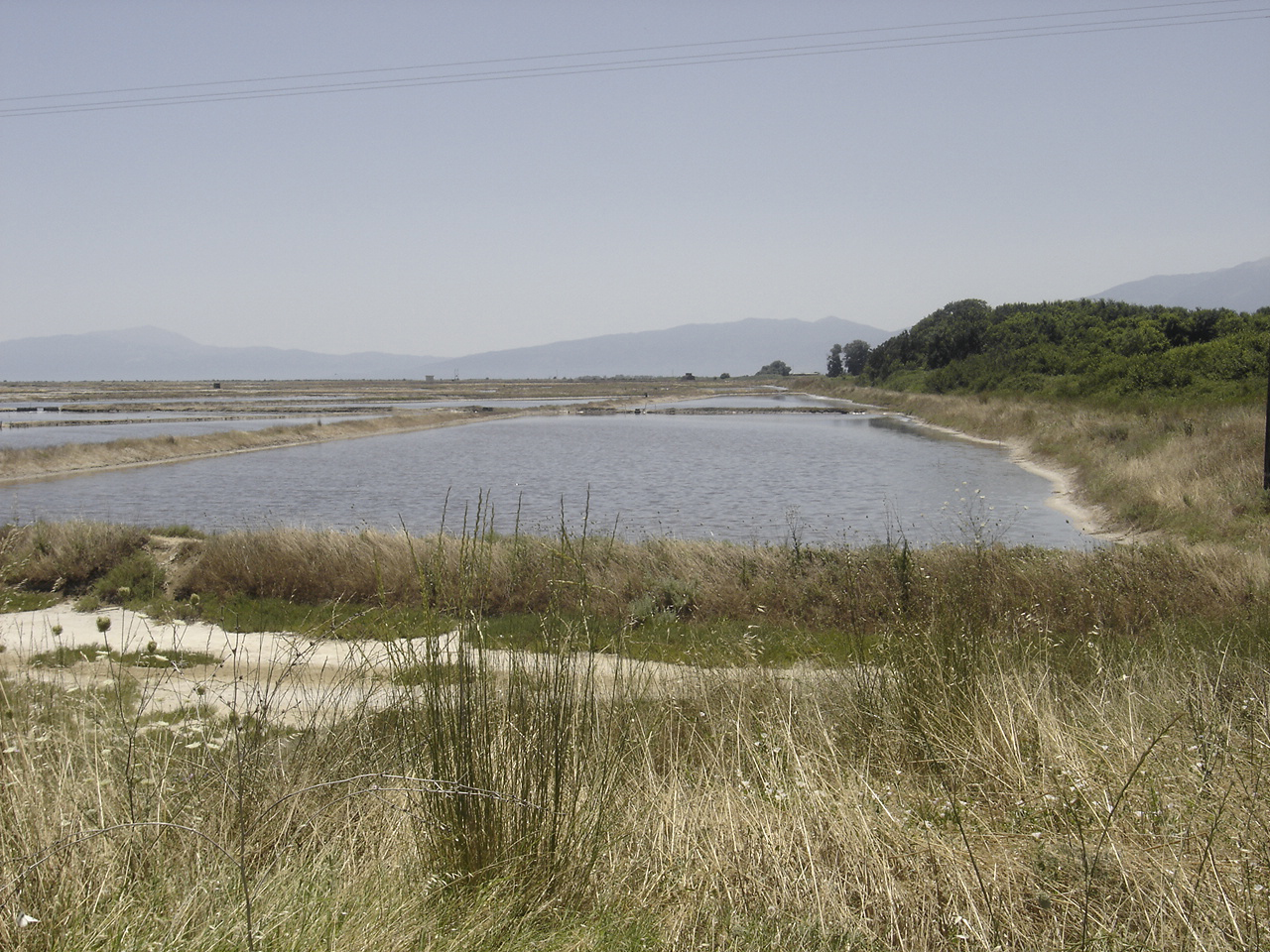
- Α salt evaporation pond in Alyki

- Location within Greece
- Coordinates: 40°22.8′N 22°37.45′E
- Country: Greece
- Administrative region: Central Macedonia
- Regional unit: Pieria
- Municipality: Pydna-Kolindros
- Municipal unit: Pydna
- Community: Pydna
- Elevation: 5 m (16 ft)

Population (2021)
  - Total: 24
- Time zone: UTC+2 (EET)
  - Summer (DST): UTC+3 (EEST)
- Postal code: 600 64
- Area code: +30-2351
- Vehicle registration: KN

Alyki (Greek: Αλυκή) is a village of the Pydna-Kolindros municipality. Before the 2011 local government reform it was part of the municipality of Pydna, of which it was a municipal district. The 2021 census recorded 24 inhabitants in the village. Alyki is a part of the community of Pydna.

== See also ==
- List of settlements in the Pieria regional unit
