= Ganochora =

Village in Pieria, Greece

Ganochora Γανόχωρα
- Community
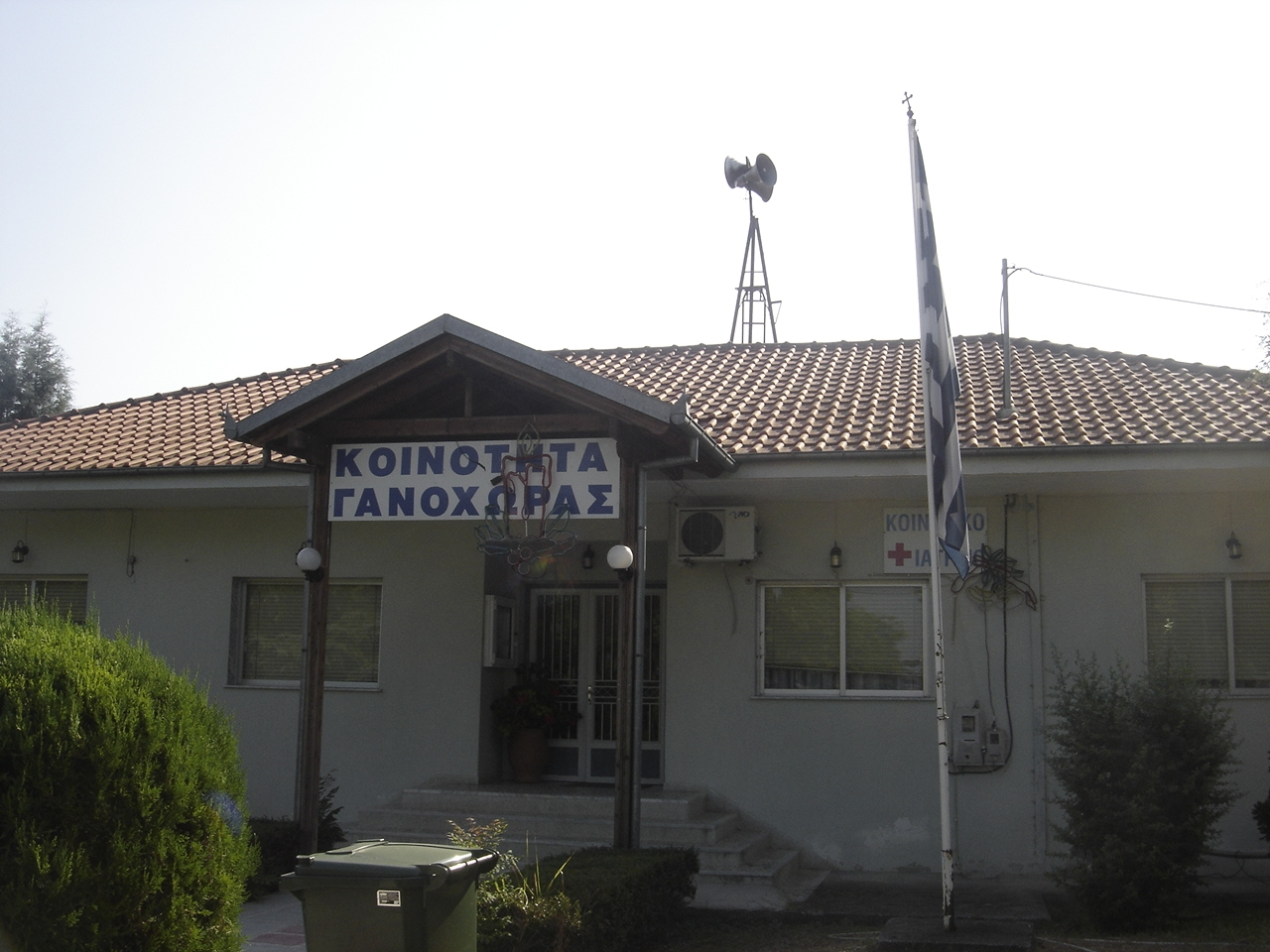
- The community hall of Ganochora

- Location within Greece
- Coordinates: 40°18.5′N 22°30′E
- Country: Greece
- Administrative region: Central Macedonia
- Regional unit: Pieria
- Municipality: Katerini
- Municipal unit: Katerini
- Elevation: 65 m (213 ft)

Population (2021)
  - Community: 656
- Time zone: UTC+2 (EET)
  - Summer (DST): UTC+3 (EEST)
- Postal code: 601 50
- Area code: +30-2351
- Vehicle registration: KN

Ganochora (Greek: Γανόχωρα) is a village in the Pieria regional unit of Central Macedonia, Greece. Administratively, it is a community of the Katerini municipality, while before the 2011 local government reform it used to be a municipal district. It has a population of 656 according to the 2021 census.

== History ==
Ganochora was established by refugees from the cities in Eastern Thrace: Ganos and Chora that settled in the area after the population exchange between Greece and Turkey in 1922.

== See also ==
- List of settlements in the Pieria regional unit
