= Pieria Asia Minor Society =

Coordinates: 40.273742°N 22.503910°E

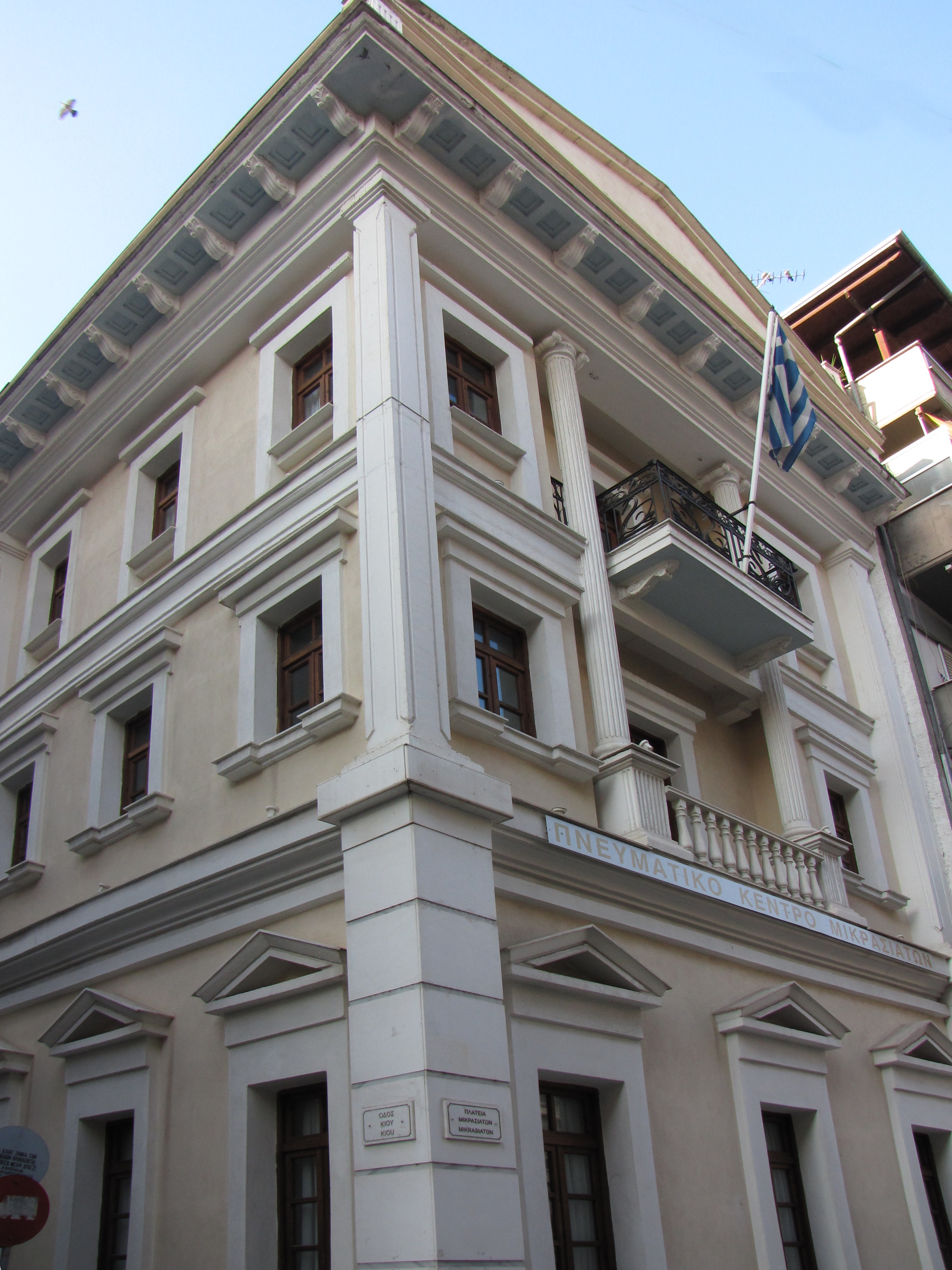
Building of the club

After the Greco-Turkish population exchange in 1923, many of the Greek refugees from Asia Minor (Anatolia) came to Macedonia. To help the new arrivals in the prefecture of Pieria, the Pieria Asia Minor Society (Greek: Σύλλογος Μικρασιατών Πιερίας, lit. 'Pieria Society of People from Asia Minor') was founded.

== Location ==
Seat of the club is at Kiou 2, corner Sarantaporou, 60100 Katerini, Pieria, Greece.

== History ==
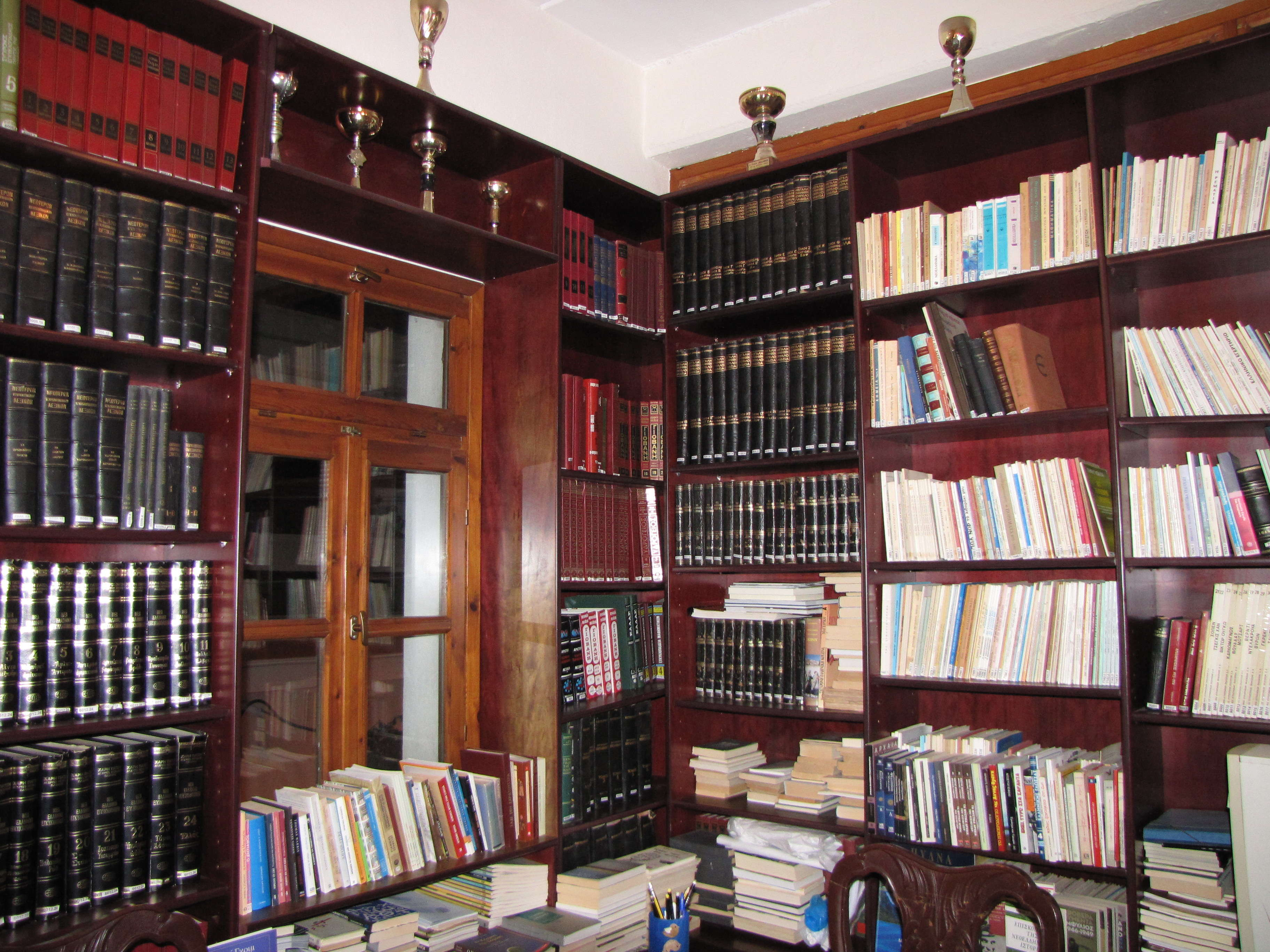
Library of the club

Between 1914 and 1923, Greeks in Eastern Thrace and Asia Minor were persecuted by the Ottomans and forcibly evicted, culminating in the Greco-Turkish population exchange of 1923.

The club was founded in 1923, for the purpose of supporting the Asia Minor refugees. The help of the Greek state and aid from abroad were not enough to support the newcomers. In 1930, the Greek state distributed land to needy residents, including the refugees. After the members no longer needed the help of the association, its activity rested from 1933 on. It was not until 1974, the club activities resumed, but the focus was now on the preservation of historical heritage and the cultivation of traditions. The club currently has (November 2018) about 900 members. The board consists of nine members; Elections are conducted every three years.

== The building ==
In 1924, the city of Katerini donated a plot of land in the city center to the club. After the activities were discontinued in 1933, the property was given to the Peasant People's Fund, whose members came mainly from Asia Minor. In 1975 the property was returned to the club. The building was built in 1985 according to plans of the association and moved in May 1990.

It consists of three floors and an attic:

- Ground floor: The hall hosts events and exhibitions. The seating offers space for 100 spectators.
- First floor: Next to the library there is the museum.
- Second floor: Offices of the Board, Secretariat, Accounting and Archives
- Attic: Clothing store for the traditional costumes of the dancers and a small cinema

== Museum ==
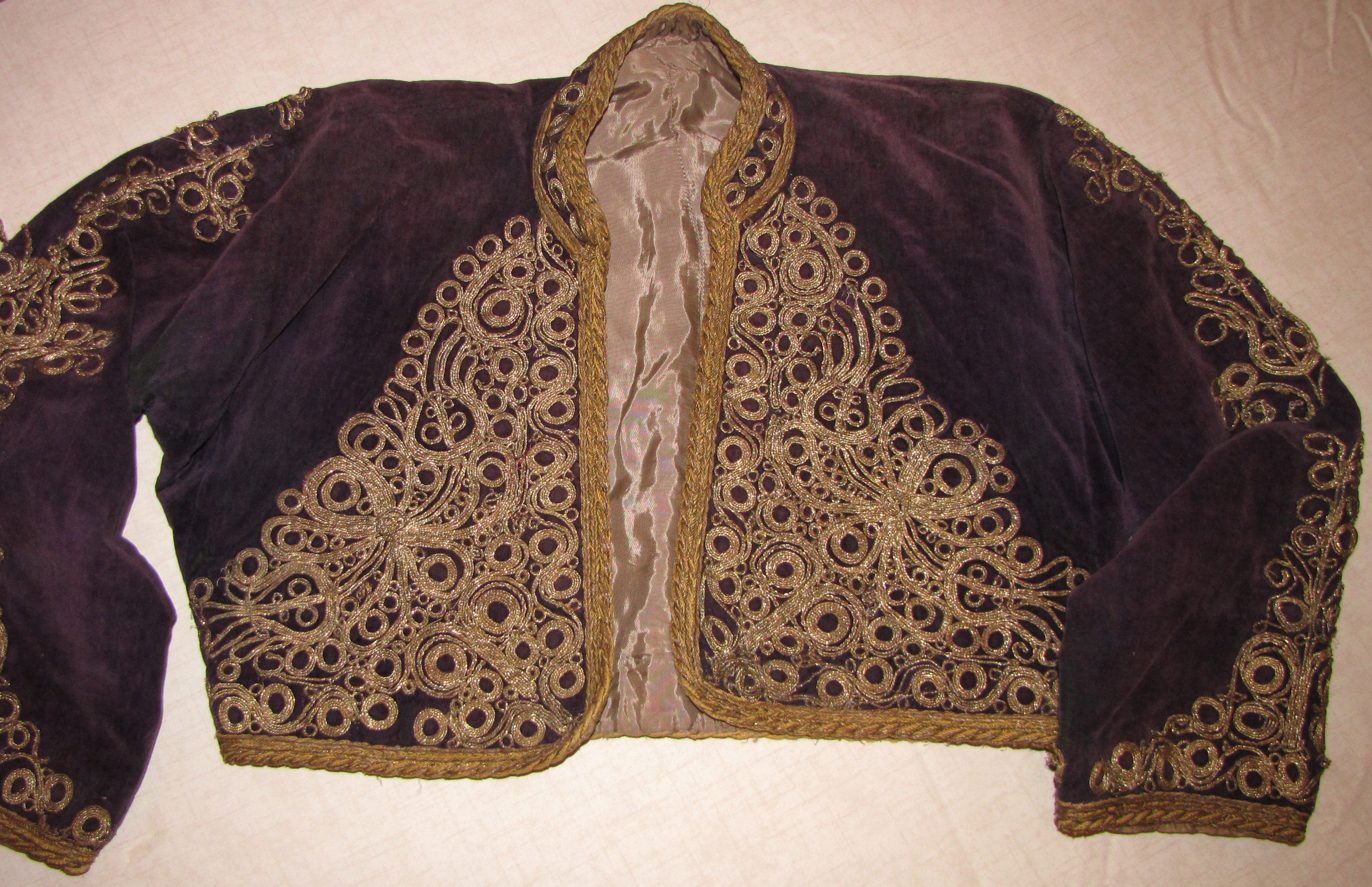
Traditional jacket, with golden thread embroidered

Most of the exhibits of the museum were donated by refugee families and are over 100 years old. On display are objects that illustrate the daily life of the Greeks in Asia Minor, as well as valuable items of clothing. Some of them are embroidered with gold thread and considerably heavy. On one wall of the room, photographs from the 19th and 20th centuries are exhibited, depicting historical events and important persons of that time. Every year, on 14 September, the anniversary of the Smyrna disaster, a three-day exhibition takes place. It is planned to expand the museum, as there are currently not enough showcases to adequately present the large number of exhibits.

== Departments ==
- Library: It contains over 3000 books.
- Museum
- Folk dance: Three groups of adults with 65 dancers, two groups of children with 40 dancers. The club currently owns around 70 costumes for the dancers.
- Choir: 35 singers
- Theater group: 15 members
- Music group for children: 15 members
- Reading group for children
- Craft group for children

Already to secure the future of the association, the care of the children receives special attention. Training and exercises of the various departments take place in the clubs building.

== Activities ==
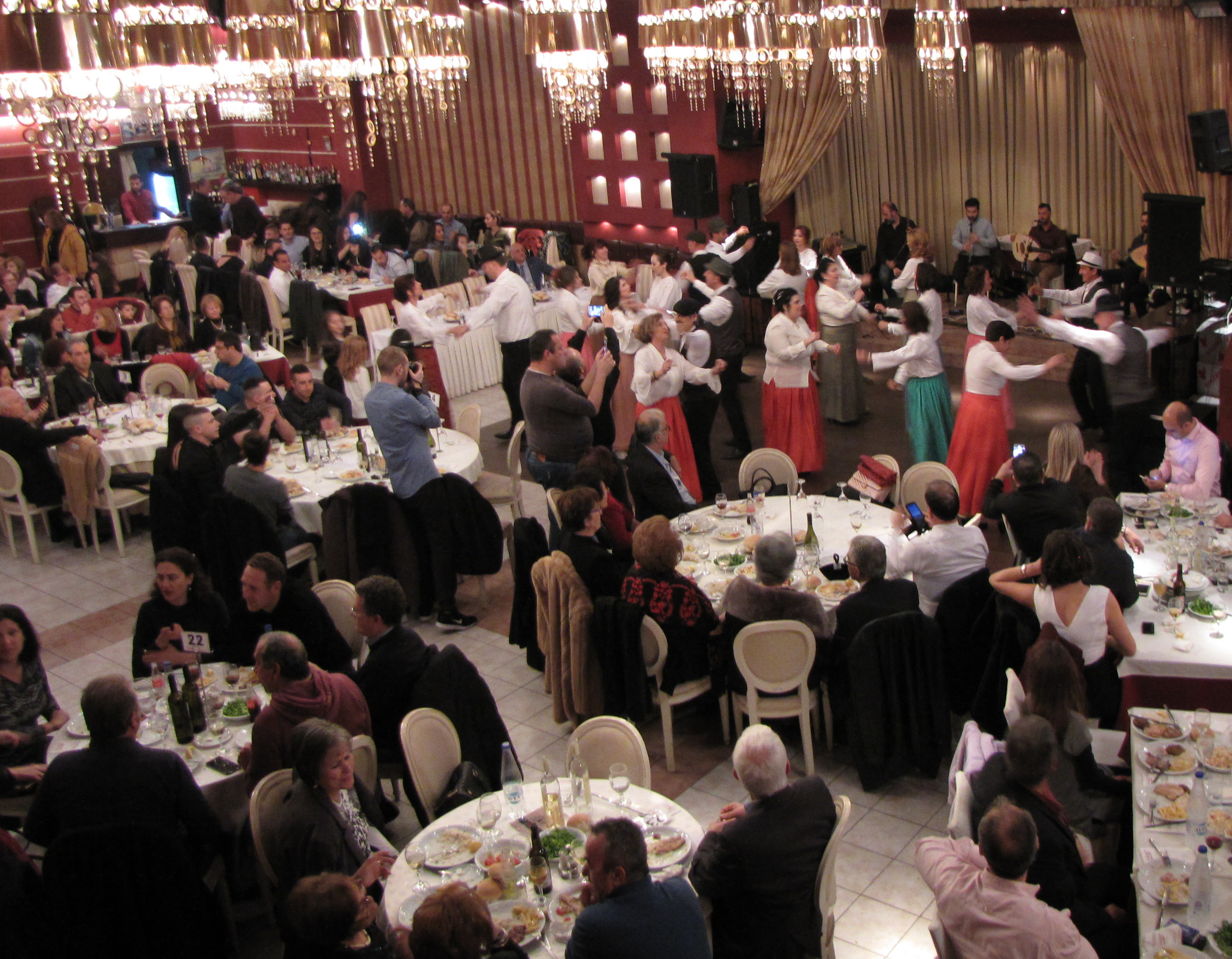
Dance event Syllogos Mikrasiaton Pierias

In June 2018, the association hosted the second Panhellenic Meeting of People from Asia Minor (2ο Πανελλήνιο Αντάμωμα Μικρασιατών) in Katerini. There were about 2000 dancers and musicians from all over Greece.

Further activities:

- Organizing of dance events
- Singing choir
- Theatre
- Various exhibitions
- Publishing of books
- Collecting and distributing goods for needy persons

Performances of the dancers, singers and the theater group took place in almost all of Greece. Abroad, Bulgaria, Italy, Turkey, Austria and Germany were traveled.

== Literature ==
- Elmar Schwertheim, Kleinasien in der Antike, C.H. Beck, 2nd ed. 2011, ISBN 978-3-406-50848-6
