= Paliampela, Pieria =

Paliampela Παλιάμπελα
- Settlement
- Location within Greece
- Coordinates: 40°30.7′N 22°30.2′E
- Country: Greece
- Administrative region: Central Macedonia
- Regional unit: Pieria
- Municipality: Pydna-Kolindros
- Municipal unit: Kolindros
- Community: Kolindros
- Elevation: 60 m (200 ft)

Population (2021)
  - Total: 152
- Time zone: UTC+2 (EET)
  - Summer (DST): UTC+3 (EEST)
- Postal code: 600 61
- Area code: +30-2353
- Vehicle registration: KN

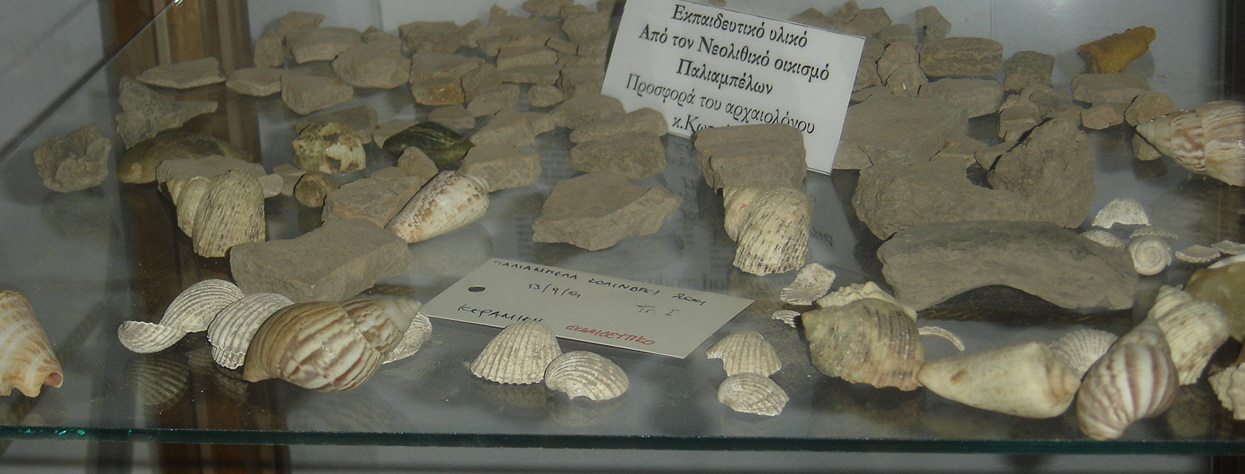
Neolithic findings found at Paliampel, Piera

Paliampela (Greek: Παλιάμπελα), known before 1928 as Lozyano (Greek: Λότζιανο), is a village of the Pydna-Kolindros municipality. Before the 2011 local government reform it was part of the municipality of Kolindros. The 2021 census recorded 152 inhabitants in the village.

== See also ==
- List of settlements in the Pieria regional unit
