= Koukkos =

Koukos Κούκος
- Community
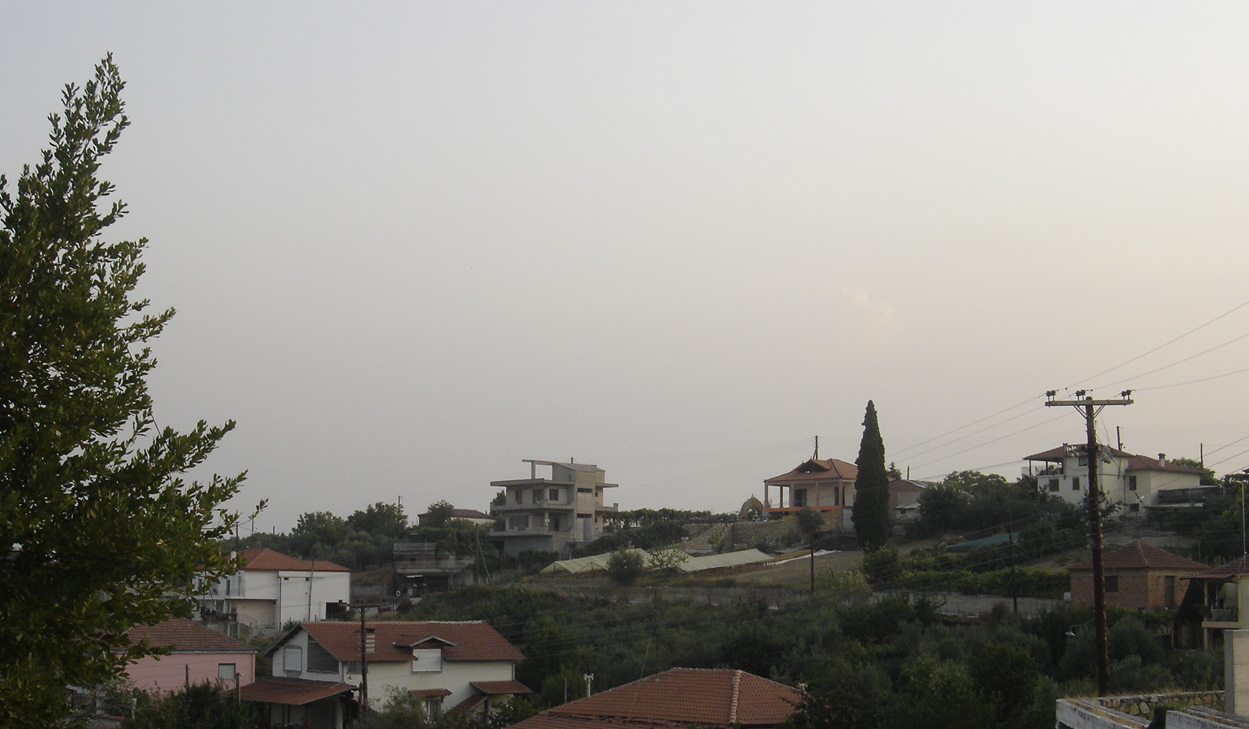
- View of Koukos

- Location within Greece
- Coordinates: 40°23′N 22°31′E
- Country: Greece
- Administrative region: Central Macedonia
- Regional unit: Pieria
- Municipality: Katerini
- Municipal unit: Korinos
- Elevation: 200–240 m (660–790 ft)

Population (2021)
  - Community: 166
- Time zone: UTC+2 (EET)
  - Summer (DST): UTC+3 (EEST)
- Postal code: 60100
- Area code: +30 23510
- Vehicle registration: KN

Koukos ( formerly Koukkos) is a village in the Pieria regional unit, Central Macedonia, Greece. It is built at an elevation of 200–240 metres and has a population of 166 inhabitants according to the 2021 census.

The village is located north of Katerini, at a distance of approximately 19 km from the city, 62 km from Thessaloniki, and about 14 km from the sea.

Before the 2011 local government reform (Kallikratis programme), Koukos formed part of the municipality of Korinos.

== Infrastructure ==
The main church of the village is the Church of Saint Demetrius, built between 1950 and 1953 by local residents under the supervision of master builder Pavlos Chatzimichaelidis. Approximately 3 km outside the village lies the chapel of Saint John the Forerunner, which has been renovated through donations by the parishioners of Koukos. The chapel is decorated with mosaics created by Michalis Papadopoulos.

Festive cultural events are held annually during the first week of August in the village’s central square.

Koukos formerly had a primary school, which has since ceased operations. During the 1930s, the school was attended by 154 pupils. Nearby facilities include a rural medical office, a pharmacy, and the offices of the local community council.

== Historical background ==
The inhabitants of Koukos settled in the village as refugees from the Pontus region and Asia Minor. Pontic traditions have been preserved over time and continue to be expressed through cultural events featuring traditional dances and songs.

A cultural and athletic association was founded in 1926, making it one of the oldest associations in the Pieria regional unit. It was established by refugees from Pontus and Asia Minor in the early refugee settlement of Koukos and has been officially recognised by the Court of Katerini since 1979. The association is a founding member of the Pieria Football Clubs Association.

The local football club, AE Koukou, participates in the championships of the Pieria Football Association and also fields a women’s team competing in the national Women’s Third Division of the Hellenic Football Federation. The club has won two regional championships, achieving promotion to the second category of the Pieria Football Association.

In the former primary school building, a vocational training centre operated briefly from 2005. Today, the premises house the Koukos Cultural Association of Saint John the Forerunner.

In 1929, Georgios Karslidis (1901–1959) resided for seven months at the chapel of Saint John the Forerunner. In March 2008, he was canonised by decision of the Ecumenical Patriarchate. Since 2009, his feast day has been commemorated annually in Koukos on 4 November by decision of the Holy Metropolis of Kitros, Katerini and Platamon.

== Koukos Youth Section ==
In recent years, a youth section has been active in Koukos, operating with the support of the Koukos Cultural Association of Saint John the Forerunner and initiated by the young residents of the village.

== Population ==
The population of Koukos increased significantly during the 1930s, following the settlement of refugees from Pontus and Asia Minor. From the 1960s onwards, the population declined rapidly, as many residents emigrated to Germany for employment—several settling there permanently—while others moved to larger Greek cities, including Katerini.

Population evolution
| Year | Population |
|---|---|
| 1928 | 248 |
| 1940 | 1,073 |
| 1951 | 947 |
| 1961 | 854 |
| 1971 | 443 |
| 1981 | 410 |
| 1991 | 326 |
| 2001 | 523 |
| 2011 | 333 |
| 2021 | 166 |

== Climate ==
Koukos has a transitional continental climate, characterised by hot summers and cold winters. The coldest months are January and February, while July and August are the warmest. Most rainfall occurs during autumn and spring, with occasional short rain showers and thunderstorms interrupting the summer heat.

Snowfall during winter mainly occurs in January and February. Frequent northerly and north-westerly winds cause frost in winter, while providing cooling conditions during summer.

== See also ==
- List of settlements in the Pieria regional unit
