= Kato Agios Ioannis =

Kato Agios Ioannis Κάτω Άγιος Ιωάννης
- Community
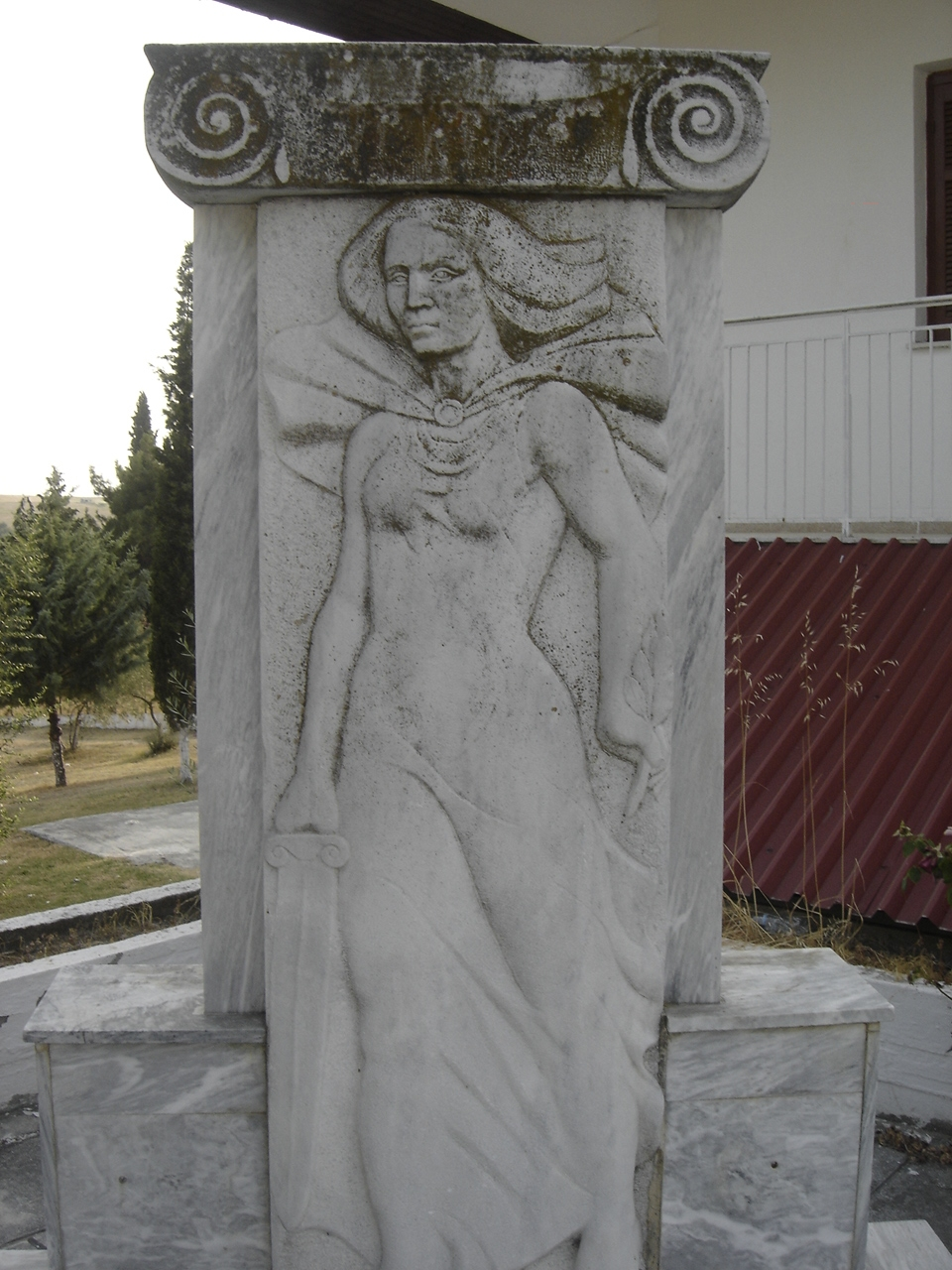
- A sculpture in Kato Agios Ioannis

- Location within Greece
- Coordinates: 40°19.5′N 22°32′E
- Country: Greece
- Administrative region: Central Macedonia
- Regional unit: Pieria
- Municipality: Katerini
- Municipal unit: Korinos
- Elevation: 60 m (200 ft)

Population (2021)
  - Community: 486
- Time zone: UTC+2 (EET)
  - Summer (DST): UTC+3 (EEST)
- Postal code: 601 00
- Area code: +30-2351
- Vehicle registration: KN

Kato Agios Ioannis (Greek: Κάτω Άγιος Ιωάννης) is a village and a community of the Katerini municipality. Before the 2011 local government reform it was part of the municipality of Korinos, of which it was a municipal district. The 2021 census recorded 486 inhabitants in the village.

== See also ==
- List of settlements in the Pieria regional unit
