= Limenas Litochorou =

Limenas Litochorou Λιμένας Λιτοχώρου
- Settlement
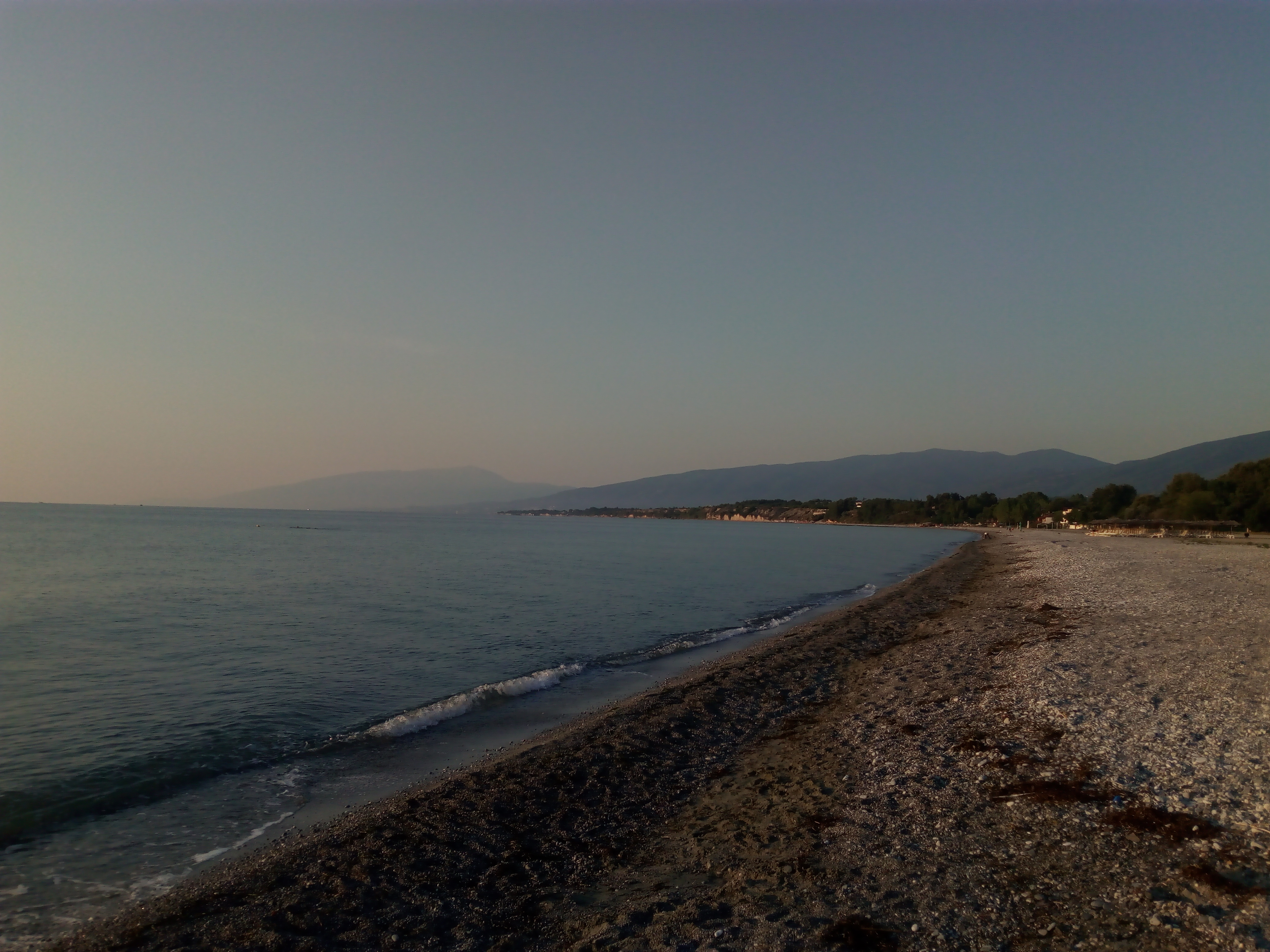

- Location within Greece
- Coordinates: 40°9.1′N 22°32.8′E
- Country: Greece
- Administrative region: Central Macedonia
- Regional unit: Pieria
- Municipality: Dio-Olympos
- Municipal unit: Litochoro
- Community: Litochoro
- Elevation: 5 m (16 ft)

Population (2021)
  - Total: 12
- Time zone: UTC+2 (EET)
  - Summer (DST): UTC+3 (EEST)
- Postal code: 600 65
- Area code: +30-2352
- Vehicle registration: ΚΝ

Limenas Litochorou (Greek: Λιμένας Λιτοχώρου) or Gritsa (Greek: Γρίτσα) is a coastal village of the Dio-Olympos municipality. Before the 2011 local government reform it was part of the municipality of Litochoro. The settlement of Limenas Litochorou had a population of 12 inhabitants as of 2021. Limenas Litochorou is a part of the community of Litochoro.

== See also ==
- List of settlements in the Pieria regional unit
