= Alonia, Pieria =

Alonia Αλώνια
- Community
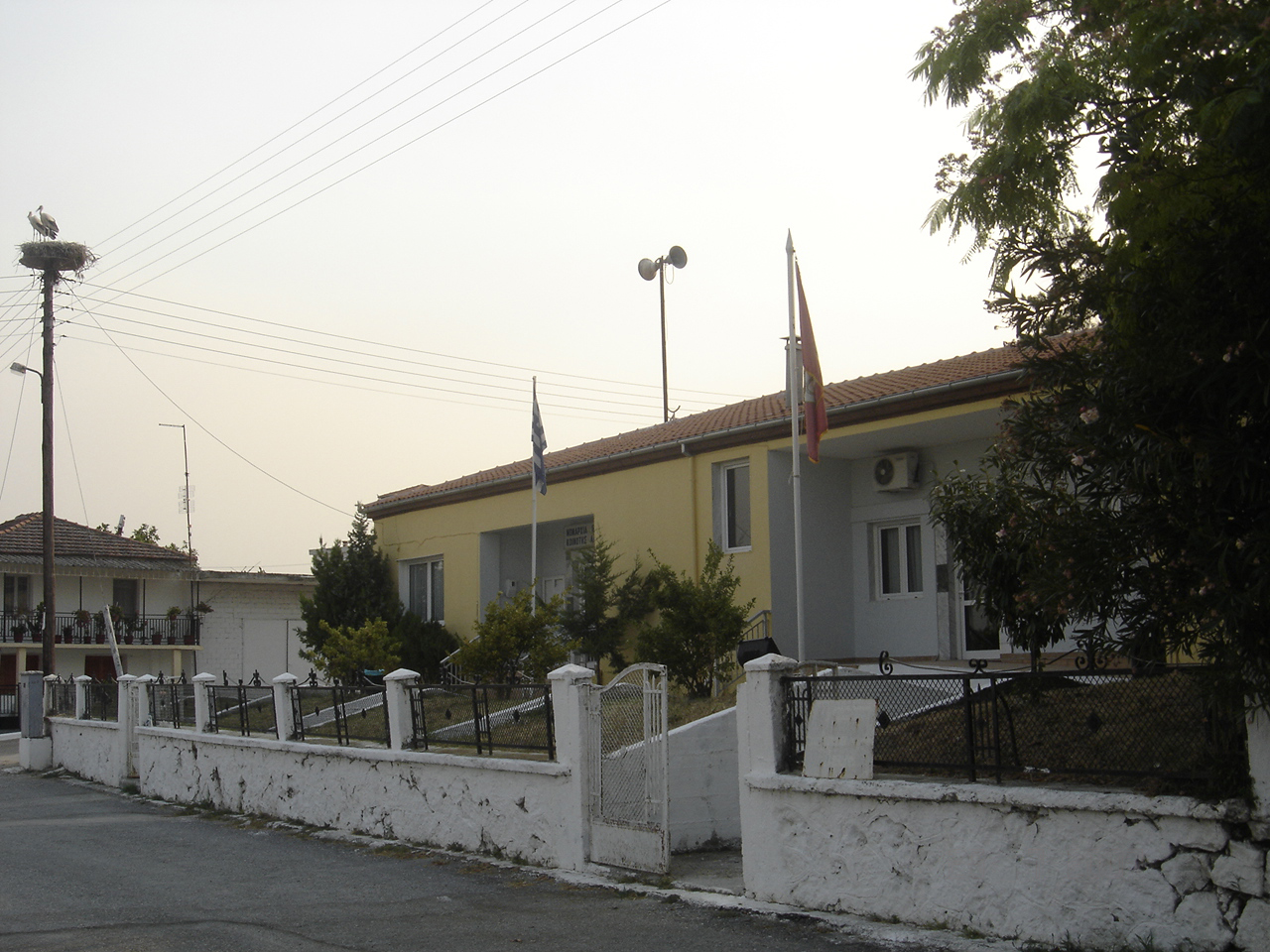
- The community hall in Alonia

- Location within Greece
- Coordinates: 40°23.5′N 22°32′E
- Country: Greece
- Administrative region: Central Macedonia
- Regional unit: Pieria
- Municipality: Pydna-Kolindros
- Municipal unit: Pydna
- Elevation: 170 m (560 ft)

Population (2021)
  - Community: 508
- Time zone: UTC+2 (EET)
  - Summer (DST): UTC+3 (EEST)
- Postal code: 600 64
- Area code: +30-2351
- Vehicle registration: KN

Alonia (Greek: Αλώνια) is a village in Pieria, Greece. Since the 2011 local government reform it is part of the municipality Pydna-Kolindros, of which it is a municipal community. The 2021 census recorded 508 residents in the village.

== See also ==
- List of settlements in the Pieria regional unit
