= Neokaisareia, Pieria =

Neokaisareia Νεοκαισάρεια
- Community
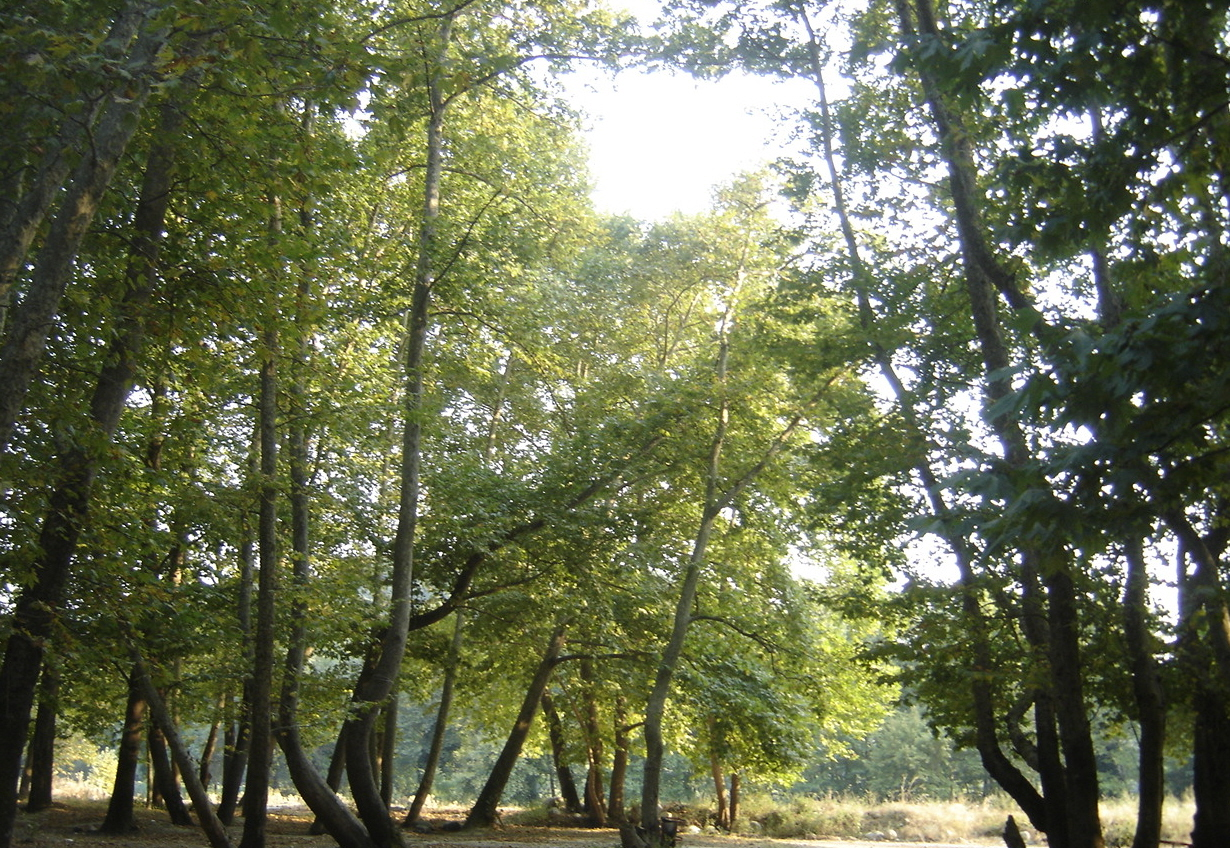
- Platanodasos forest near Neokaisareia

- Location within Greece
- Coordinates: 40°16′N 22°25.5′E
- Country: Greece
- Administrative region: Central Macedonia
- Regional unit: Pieria
- Municipality: Katerini
- Municipal unit: Katerini
- Village established: 1928 (98 years ago)
- Elevation: 90 m (300 ft)

Population (2021)
  - Community: 339
- Time zone: UTC+2 (EET)
  - Summer (DST): UTC+3 (EEST)
- Postal code: 601 50
- Area code: +30-2351
- Vehicle registration: KN

Neokaisareia (Greek: Νεοκαισάρεια, literally "New Caesarea") is a village and a community of the Katerini municipality in Greece. The village was founded in 1928 by Greek refugees coming from the town of Neocaesarea in Pontus. Until the 2011 local government reform it used to be a municipal district. The 2021 census recorded 339 inhabitants in the village.

== See also ==
- List of settlements in the Pieria regional unit
