= Trilofos, Pieria =

Trilofos Τρίλοφος
- Community
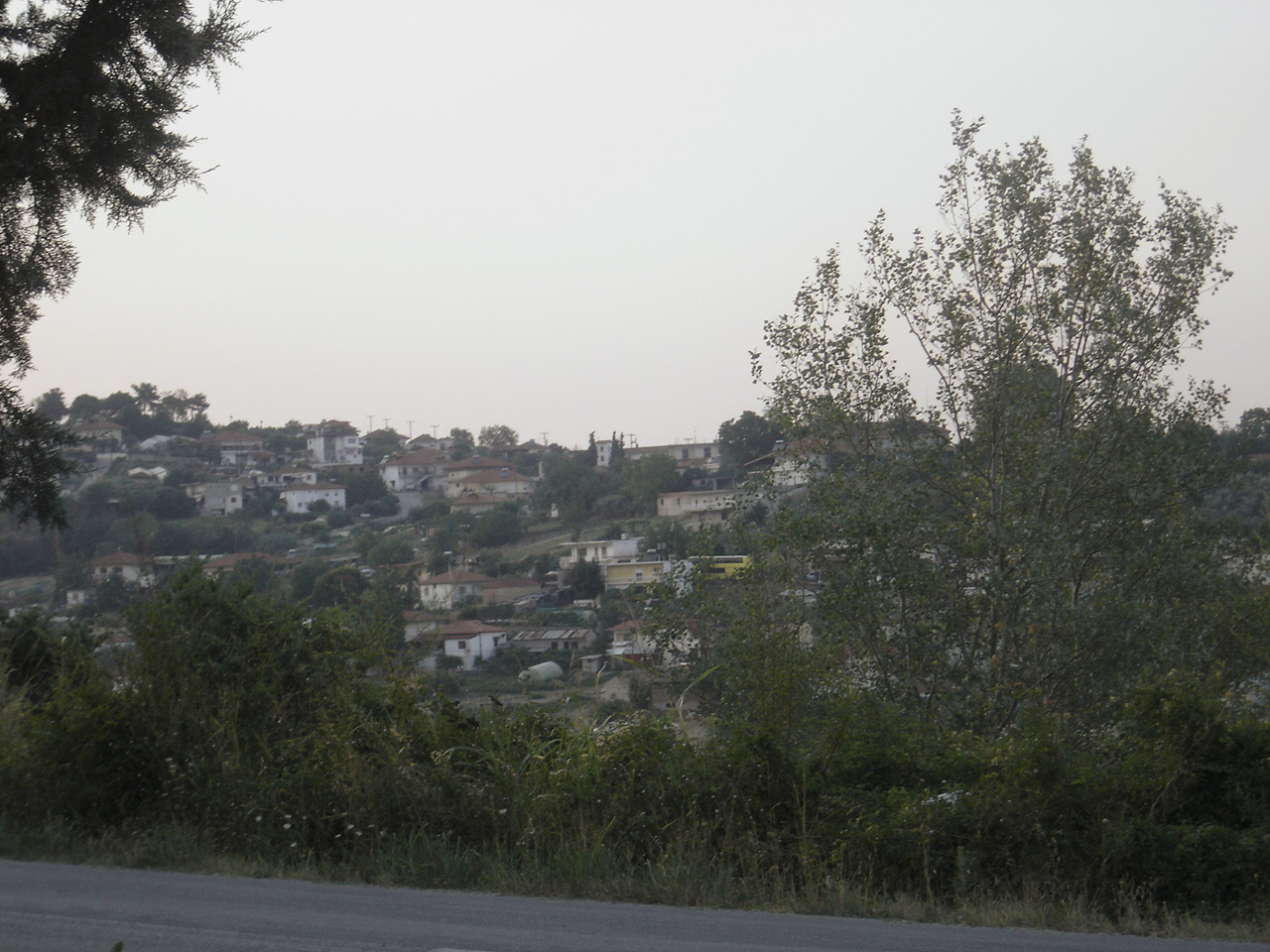
- View of Trilofos

- Location within Greece
- Coordinates: 40°22′N 22°27.5′E
- Country: Greece
- Administrative region: Central Macedonia
- Regional unit: Pieria
- Municipality: Katerini
- Municipal unit: Elafina
- Elevation: 300 m (980 ft)

Population (2021)
  - Community: 397
- Time zone: UTC+2 (EET)
  - Summer (DST): UTC+3 (EEST)
- Postal code: 601 00
- Area code: +30-2351
- Vehicle registration: KN

Trilofos (Greek: Τρίλοφος) is a village and a community of the Katerini municipality. Before the 2011 local government reform it was part of the municipality of Elafina, of which it was a municipal district. The 2021 census recorded 397 inhabitants in the village.
