= Livadi, Pieria =

Livadi Λιβάδι
- Community
- Location within Greece
- Coordinates: 40°30′N 22°26′E
- Country: Greece
- Administrative region: Central Macedonia
- Regional unit: Pieria
- Municipality: Pydna-Kolindros
- Municipal unit: Kolindros

Area
  - Community: 14.769 km^{2} (5.702 sq mi)
- Elevation: 200 m (660 ft)

Population (2021)
  - Community: 183
  - Density: 12.4/km^{2} (32.1/sq mi)
- Time zone: UTC+2 (EET)
  - Summer (DST): UTC+3 (EEST)
- Postal code: 600 61
- Area code: +30-2353
- Vehicle registration: KN

Livadi (Greek: Λιβάδι) is a village in Pieria regional unit, Greece. Since the 2011 local government reform it is part of the municipality Pydna-Kolindros, of which it is a municipal community. The 2021 census recorded 183 residents in the village. The community of Livadi covers an area of 14.769 km^{2}.

== See also ==
- Pydna-Kolindros
