= Vria =

Vria Βρία
- Community
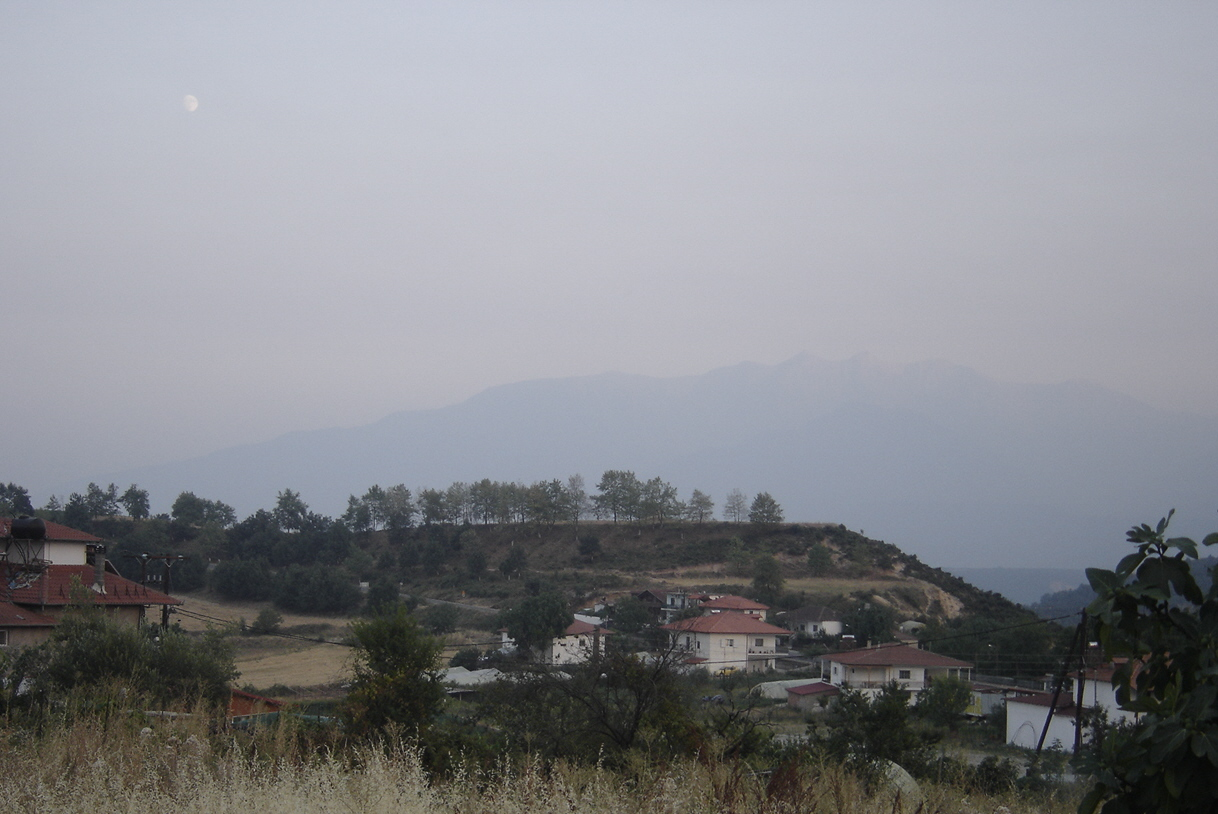
- View of Vria

- Location within Greece
- Coordinates: 40°16.5′N 22°19.5′E
- Country: Greece
- Administrative region: Central Macedonia
- Regional unit: Pieria
- Municipality: Katerini
- Municipal unit: Pierioi
- Elevation: 330 m (1,080 ft)

Population (2021)
  - Community: 319
- Time zone: UTC+2 (EET)
  - Summer (DST): UTC+3 (EEST)
- Postal code: 601 00
- Area code: +30-2351
- Vehicle registration: KN

Vria (Greek: Βρία) or Vrya (Greek: Βρύα) is a village and a community of the Katerini municipality. Before the 2011 local government reform, it was part of the municipality of Pierioi. The 2021 census recorded 319 inhabitants in the village.
