= Pieria (regional unit) =

Pieria Περιφερειακή ενότητα Πιερίας
- Regional unit
- Municipalities of Pieria

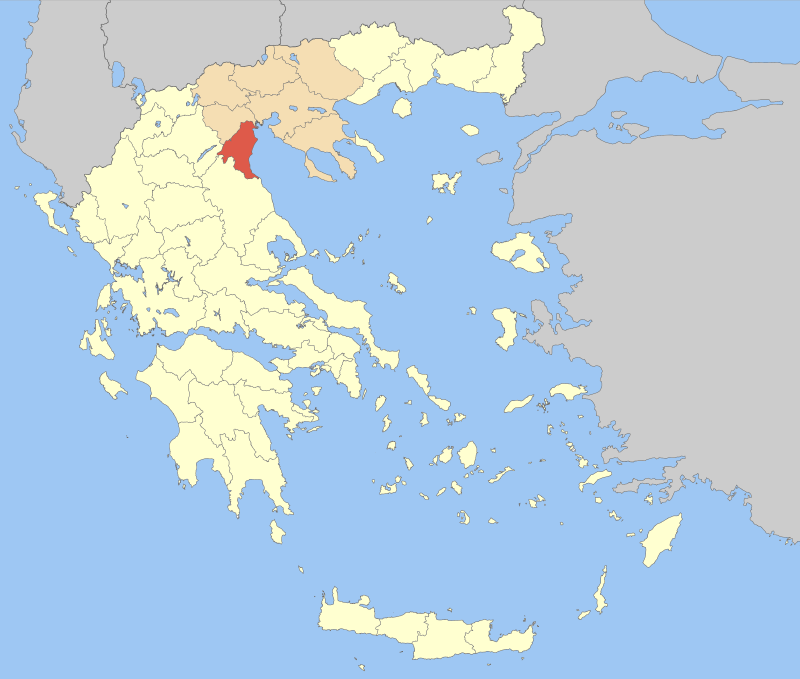
- Pieria within Greece

- Location within Greece
- Coordinates: 40°15′N 22°25′E
- Country: Greece
- Geographic region: Macedonia
- Administrative region: Central Macedonia
- Seat: Katerini

Area
  - Total: 1,516 km^{2} (585 sq mi)

Population (2021)
  - Total: 119,384
  - Density: 78.75/km^{2} (204.0/sq mi)
- Time zone: UTC+2 (EET)
  - Summer (DST): UTC+3 (EEST)
- Postal code: 60x xx
- Area code: 235x0
- Vehicle registration: ΚΝ
- Website: www.pkm.gov.gr/p-e-pierias/

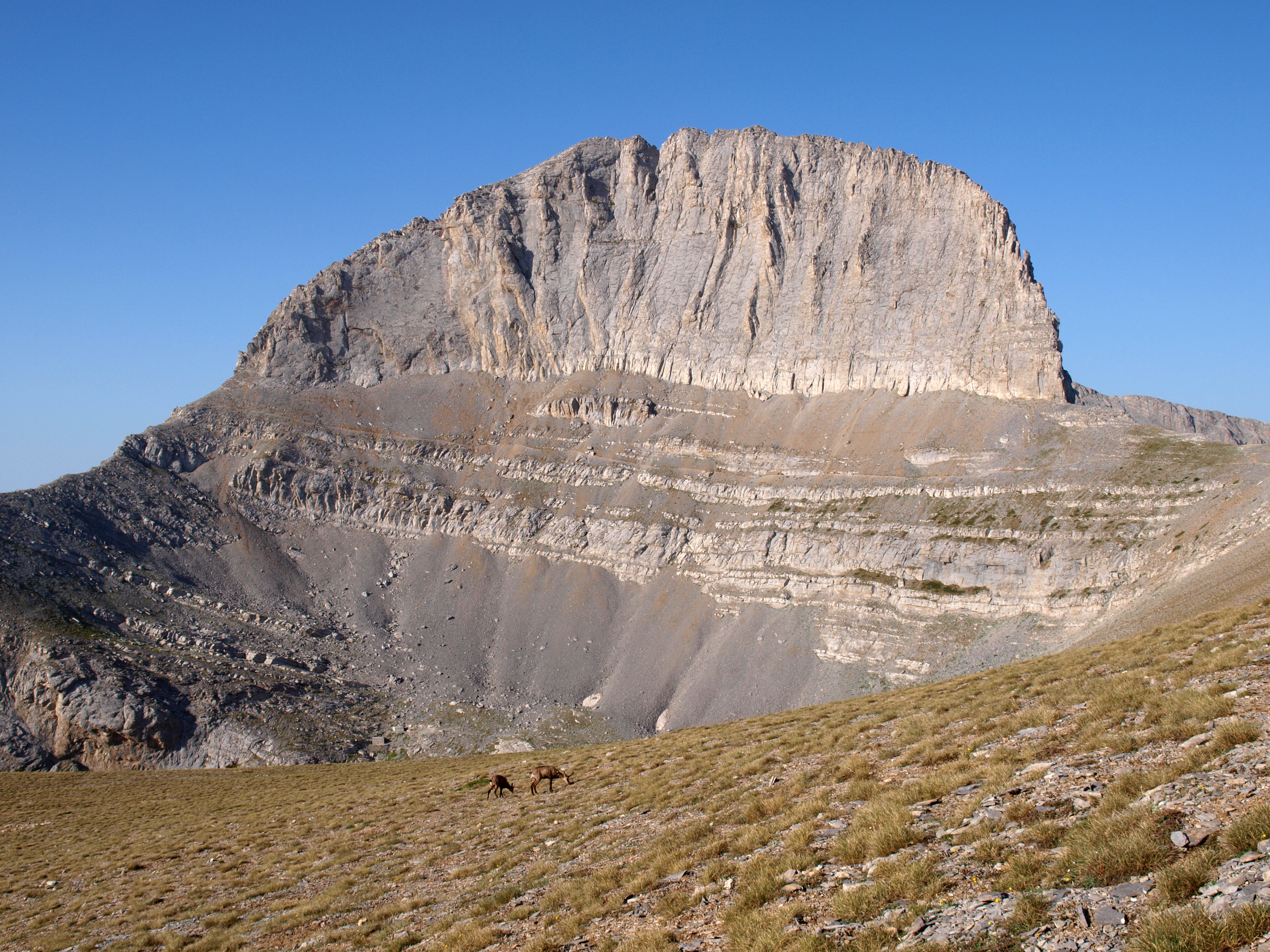
Mount Olympus

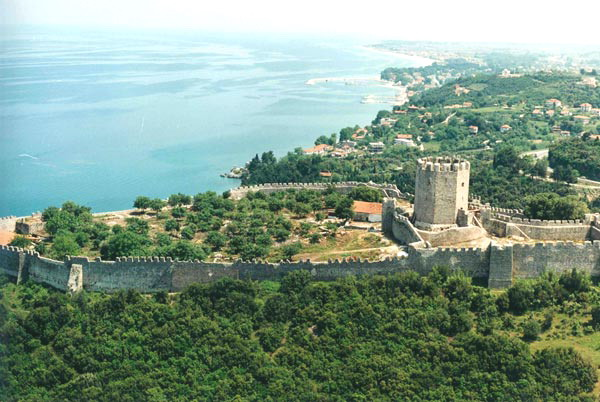
The Venetian Platamon Castle

Pieria (Greek: Πιερία) is one of the regional units of Greece located in the southern part of the Region of Central Macedonia, within the historical province of Macedonia. Its capital is the town of Katerini. The name Pieria originates from the ancient Pieres tribe. In Pieria, there are many sites of archeological interest, such as Dion, Pydna, Leivithra and Platamonas. Pieria contains Mount Pierus, from which Hermes takes flight in order to visit Calypso, and is the home of Orpheus, the Muses, and contains the Pierian Spring. Mount Olympus, the highest mountain in Greece and throne of the ancient Greek gods, is located in the southern part of Pieria. Other ancient cities included Leibethra and Pimpleia.

== Geography ==
The Pieria regional unit is bordered by Imathia to the north, Kozani to the west, and to the south and west by the region of Thessaly's Regional Unit of Larissa. The Pierian Mountains lie to the west; the Thermaic Gulf lies to the east. It also has a valley by the EO13 road. Most of the population live within the Olympian Riviera. The lowest point is the Thermaic Gulf and the highest point is Mount Olympus.

It combines extensive plains, high mountains and sandy beaches. The region's beauty gives it a great potential for further tourist development.

The main beaches are Paralia, Olympiaki Akti, Korinos, Neoi Poroi, Methoni, Leptokarya, Platamonas, Skotina, Kalyvia Varikou, Limenas Litochorou (also known as Gritsa). Many of the Pieria's beaches have been awarded the Blue Flag certification by the Foundation for Environmental Education (FEE).

== Climate ==
Its climate is mainly of Mediterranean type with hot summers and cool winters. Severe winter weather is common in the central and western parts of Pieria, especially in the Pierian Mountains and on Mount Olympus.

On June 8, 2007, a low pressure weather system from Southern and Central Europe resulted in heavy rainfall that ravaged the prefecture and caused great damage in fruit and vegetable production. The worst hit area was Korinos.

== Administration ==
The Regional Unit of Pieria is divided into 3 municipalities. These are (number as in the map in the infobox):

- Katerini (1)
- Dion-Olympos (2)
- Pydna-Kolindros (3)

=== Prefecture ===
As a part of the 2011 Kallikratis government reform, the Regional Unit of Pieria was created out of the former prefecture Pieria (Greek: Νομός Πιερίας). The prefecture had the same territory as the present regional unit. At the same time, the municipalities were reorganized, according to the table below (list of municipalities of Greece - 2011).

New municipality	Old municipalities	Seat
Dion-Olympos	Dion	Litochoro
Dion-Olympos	East Olympos	Litochoro
Dion-Olympos	Litochoro	Litochoro
Katerini	Katerini	Katerini
Katerini	Elafina	Katerini
Katerini	Korinos	Katerini
Katerini	Paralia	Katerini
Katerini	Petra	Katerini
Katerini	Pierioi	Katerini
Pydna-Kolindros	Aiginio	Aiginio
Pydna-Kolindros	Kolindros	Aiginio
Pydna-Kolindros	Methoni	Aiginio
Pydna-Kolindros	Pydna	Aiginio

== History ==
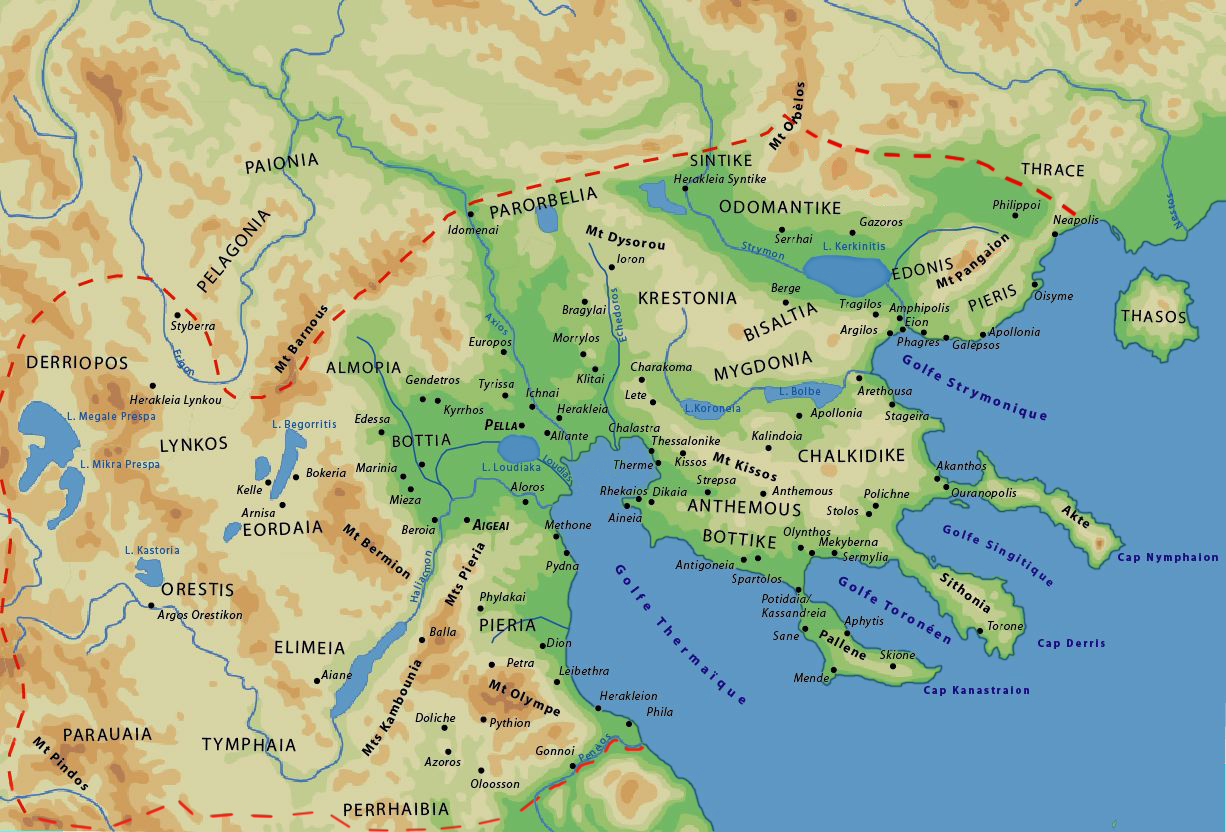
Map of the Kingdom of Macedon with Pieria located in the southern districts of the kingdom.

The region, known as Pieria (Ancient Greek: Πιερία) in antiquity, took its name from the Pieres (Πίερες), a Thracian tribe that was expelled by the Macedonians in the 8th century BC from their original seats, and driven to the North beyond the Strymon river and Mount Pangaeus, where they formed a new settlement in Edonis, known as Pieris (Ancient Greek: Πιερίς) near modern Piereis. The name Pieria has been connected to Homeric πῖαρ "fat", πίειραν ἄρουραν "fertile land" in a metaphorical sense.

At some time before the archaic period Pieria was incorporated in the Kingdom of Macedon (808 BC, see below) when it became the second province of the ancient kingdom, following its fate through the rule of the Antipatrid dynasty (302 BC - 277 BC) and the Antigonid dynasty (306 BC - 168 BC). It became part of the Roman Republic after the Fourth Macedonian War, and remained part of the Roman Empire and its successor, the Byzantine Empire.

It was later invaded and became a part of the Ottoman Empire. During the Greek War of Independence in 1821, Pieria took up arms along with the rest of Greece, but their struggle failed and Pieria did not join the rest of Greece until the Balkan Wars in 1913. Until 1947, Pieria was part of the Thessaloniki Prefecture (at that time the largest Greek prefecture), as a province. Pieria saw an economic boom in agriculture and business. During the Greco-Turkish War, it saw an influx of refugees from Asia Minor, now a part of Turkey, and several places were named after their former homelands including Nea Trapezounta from Trebizond (now Trabzon) and Nea Efesos from Ephesus (now Efes). The village of Elafos in the municipal unit Elafina, formerly a community in the Imathia prefecture, was attached to Pieria in 1974.

== Transport ==
The Piraeus–Platy railway passes through Pieria, with the main train stations being in Katerini. The main roads passing through the regional unit are the A1 motorway (part of European route E75), as well as the EO1 and EO13 national roads.

== Culture ==
- Balla
- Phylace
- Spathes
- Louloudies
- Olympus Festival
- Macedonian Tombs, Korinos
- Macedonian Tombs, Katerini
- Folklore Museum of Katerini (Katerini)
- Pieria Asia Minor Society Museum (Katerini)
- Archaeological Park of Dion (Dion)
- Archaeological Museum of Dion (Dion)
- Maritime Museum of Litochoro (Litochoro)
- List of Castles of Regional Unit of Piera
- Mastodon Museum of Neokaisareia (Neokaisareia)
- Olympus Geological History Museum (Leptokarya)
- Visitable Museum Store in Makrygialos (Makrygialos)
- Ecclesiastical Museum of the Metropolis of Kitros, Katerini and Platamon (Katerini)

== Sporting teams ==
- Pierikos - Greek Third Division
- Ethnikos Neo Keramidi - Greek Third Division
- A.E. Karitsa - Greek Third Division
- Ermis Exochi - Greek Third Division

== Notable people ==
- George Zorbas (1865–1941), the man upon whom Nikos Kazantzakis based Alexis Zorbas the protagonist of his 1946 novel Zorba the Greek
- Katerina Nikolaidou (1992), rower athlete, 4th place 2016 Olympic Games, silver medal in the lightweight single sculls at the 2013 and 2014 World Rowing Championships
- Eleni Chatziliadou (1993), karate athlete, Kumite +68 kg 2018 World Karate Championship
- Theodoros Terzopoulos (1945), theater director
- Basil Athanasiadis (1970), musician, composer
- Patriarch Callinicus of Alexandria (1800–1889)
- Yannis K. Semertzidis (1961), physicist
- Kostas Zolotas (1934–2021), climber, mountain guide
- Christos Kakkalos (1882–1976), climber, mountain guide

== Gallery ==
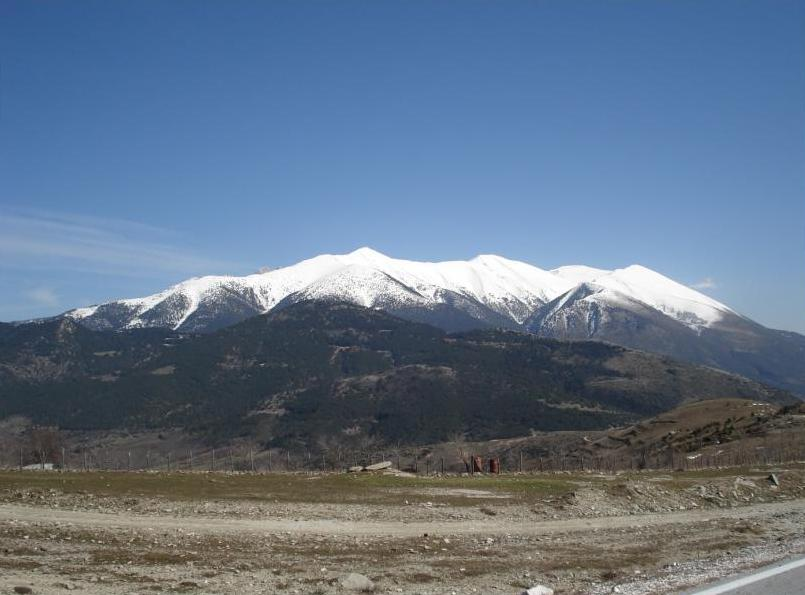
Mount Olympus

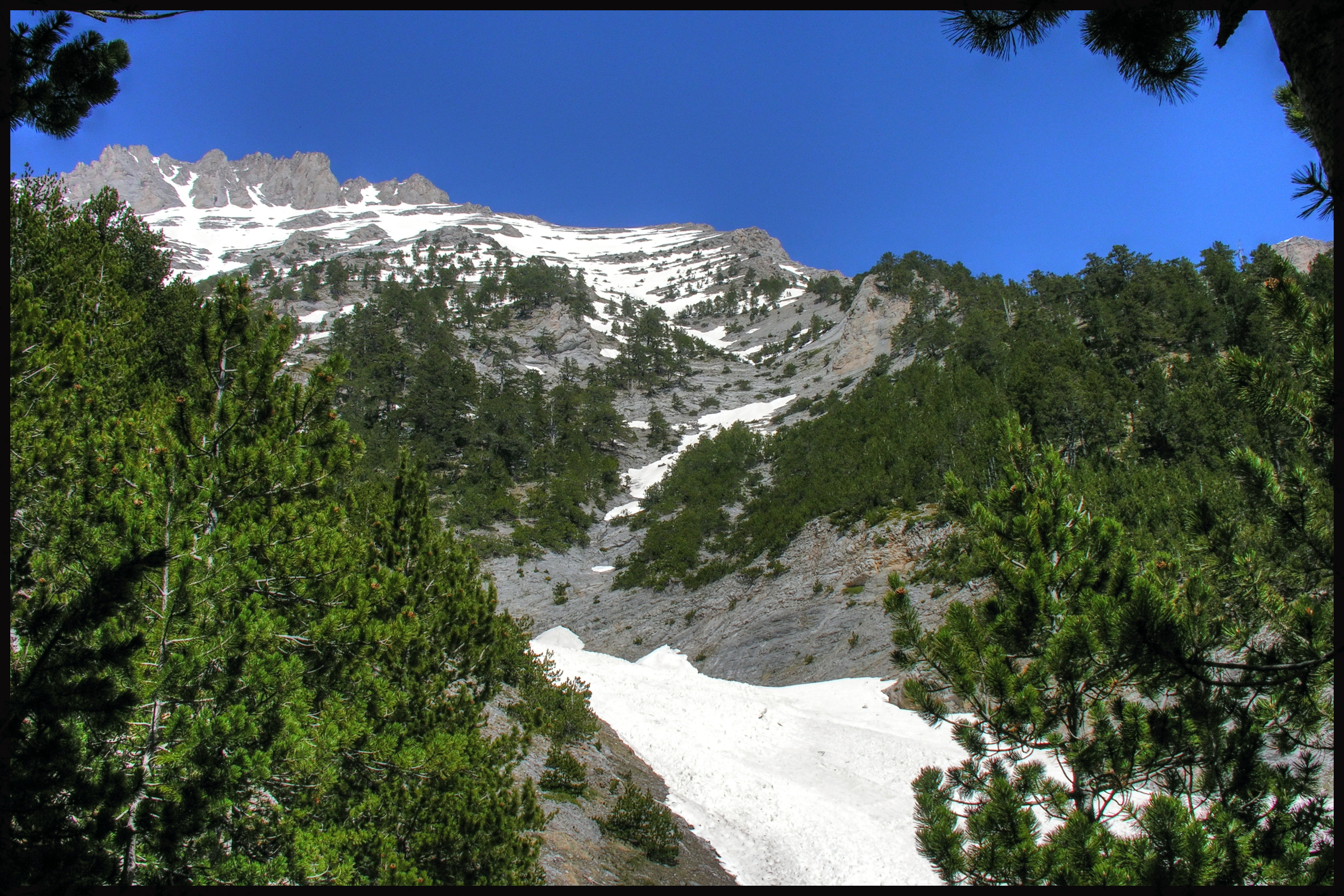
Mount Olympus

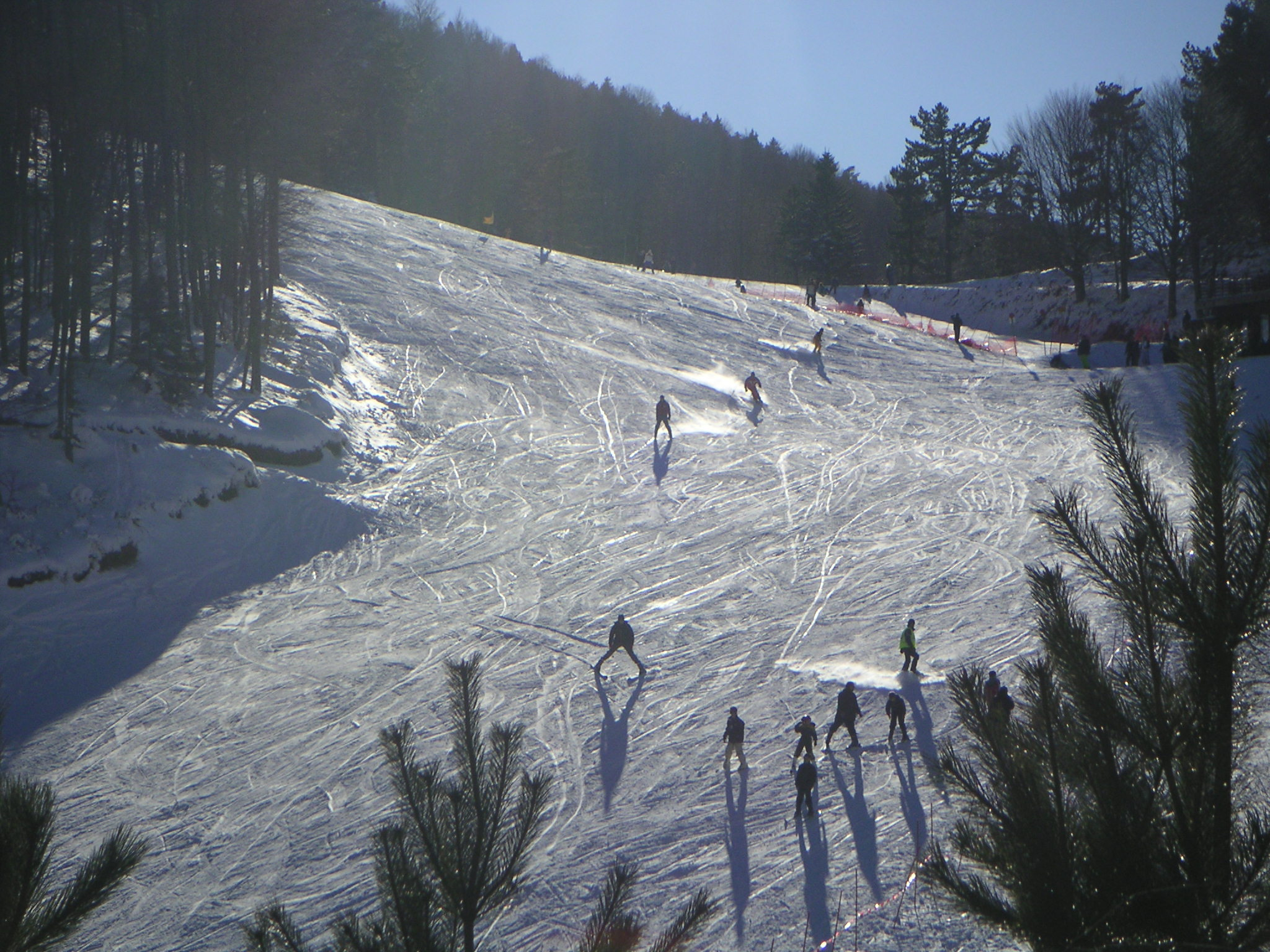
Ski center of Elatochori

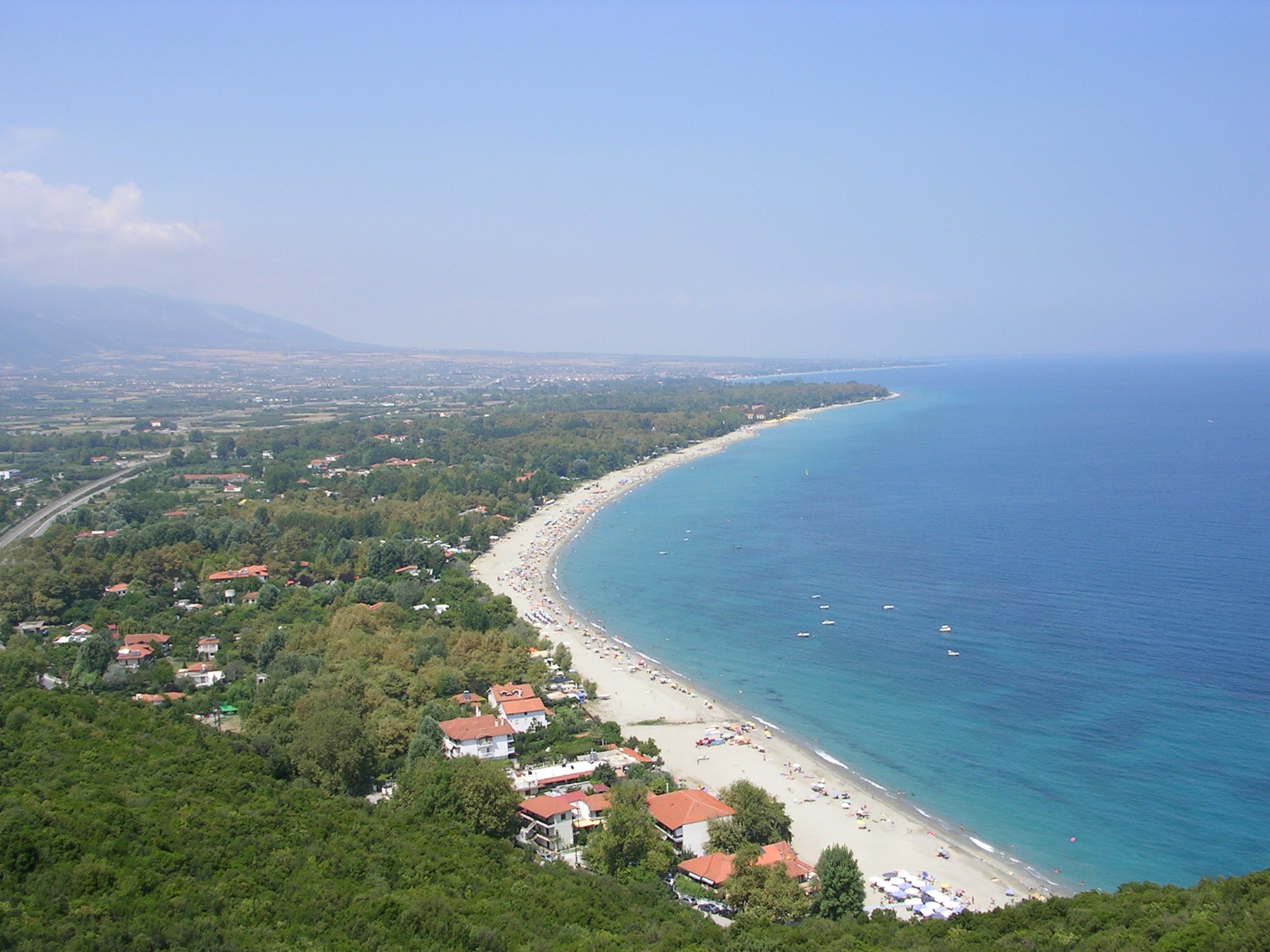
Platamon beach

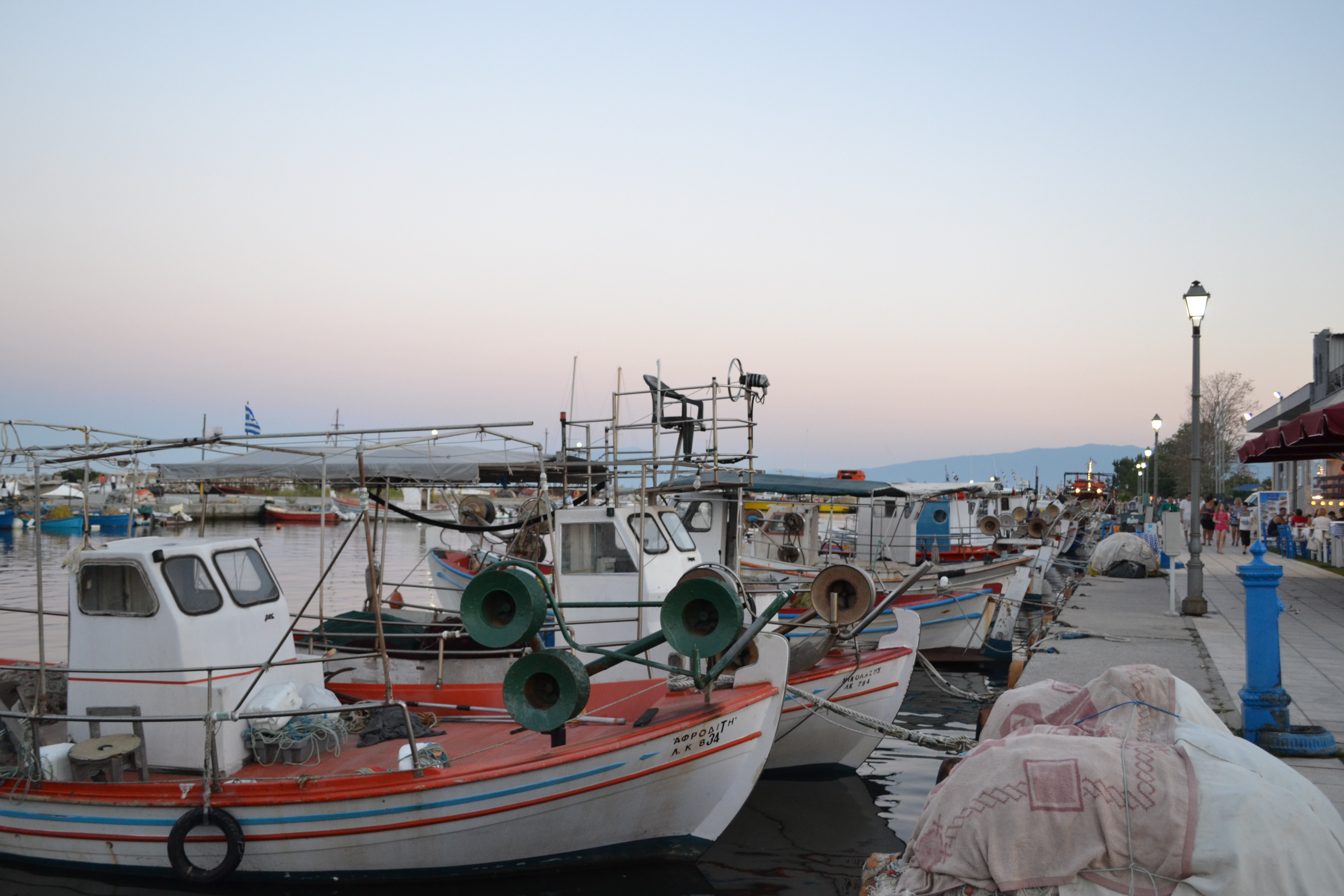
Paralia dock

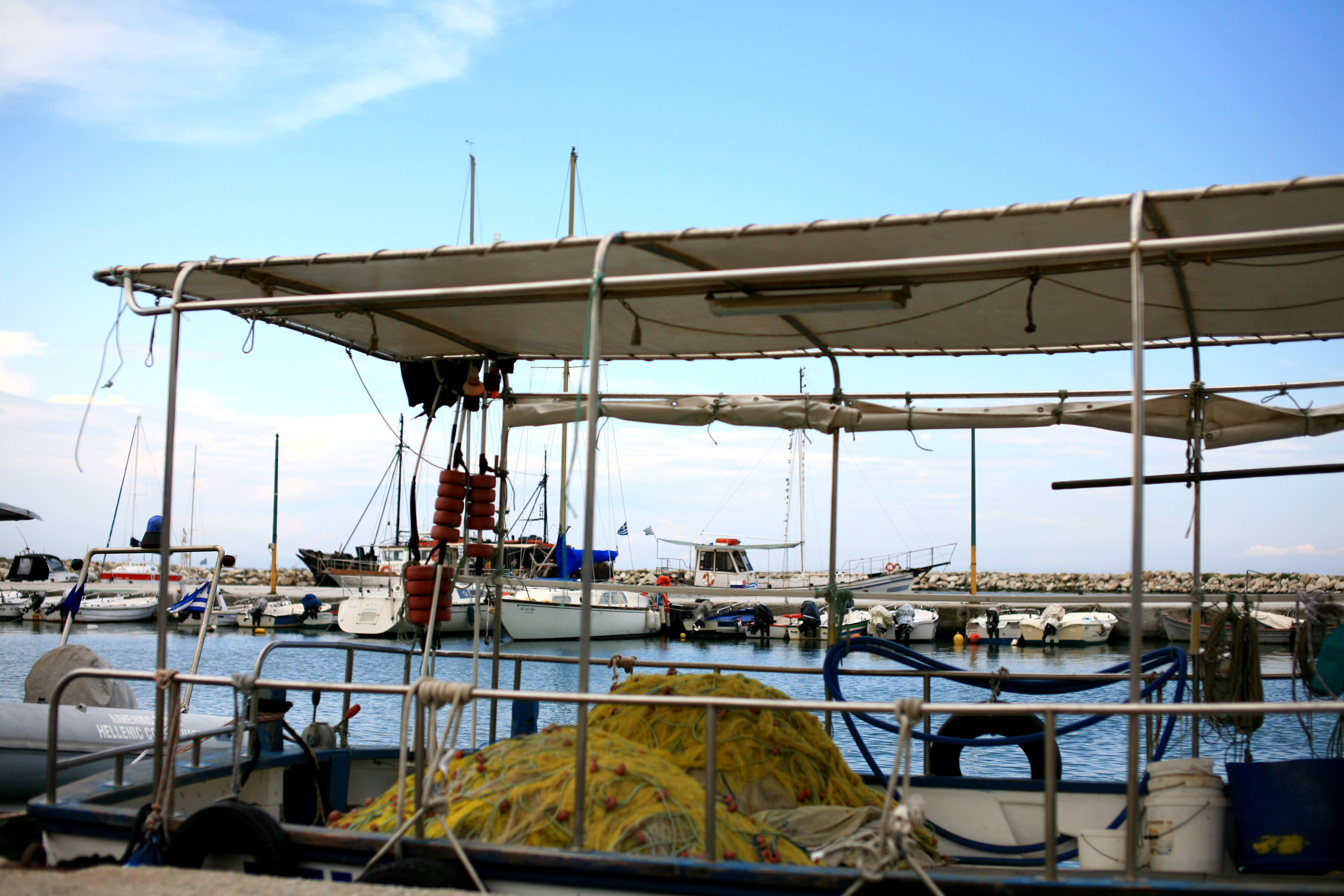
Paralia

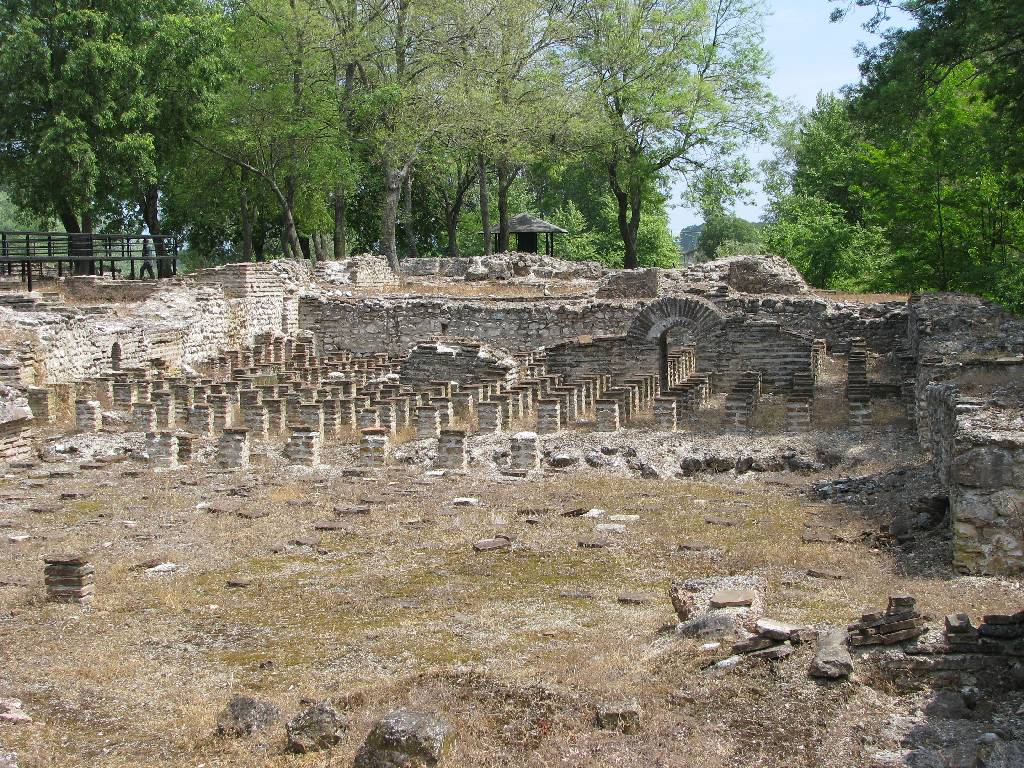
Archaeological Park of Dion

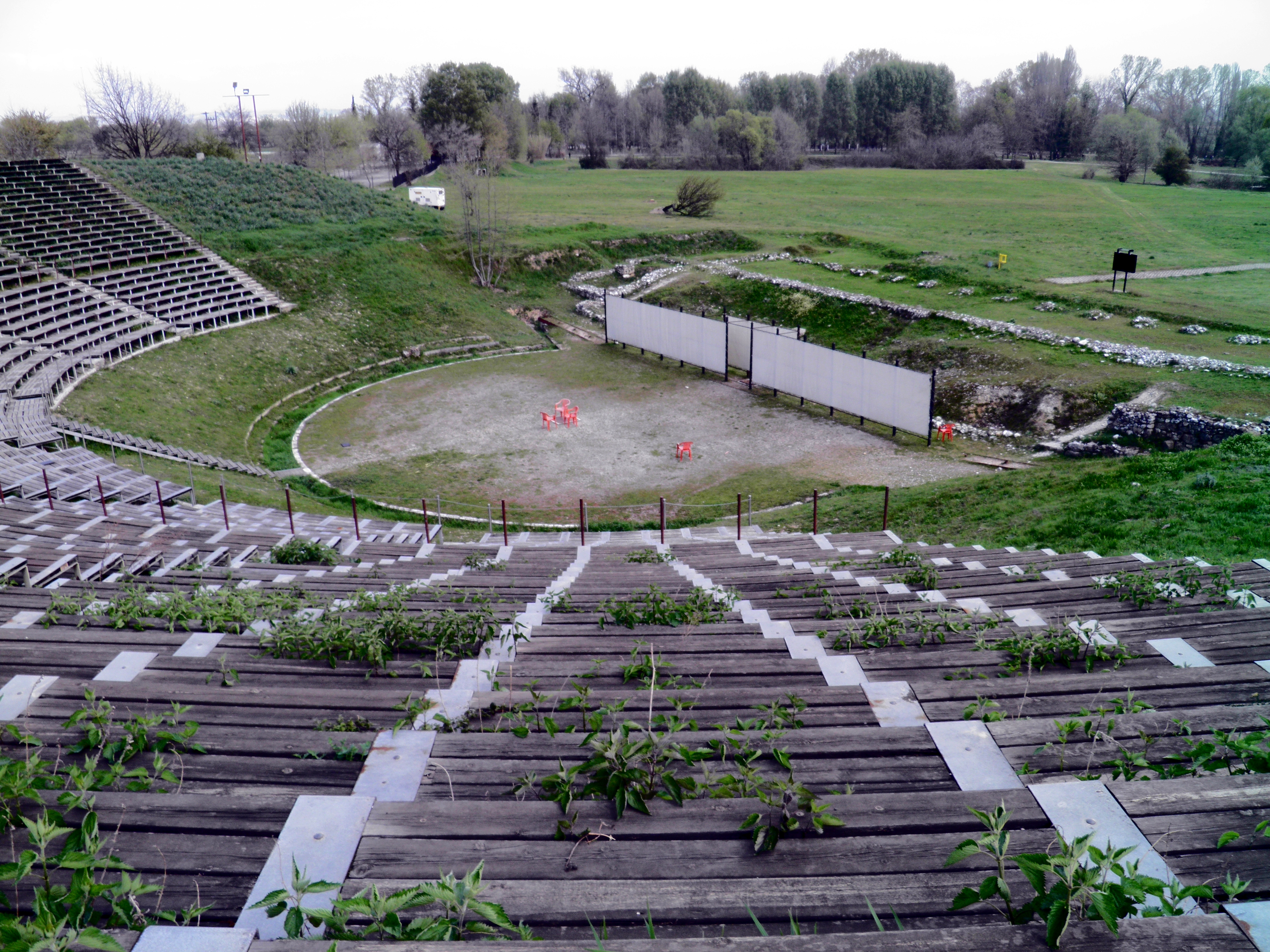
Hellenistic theatre of Dion

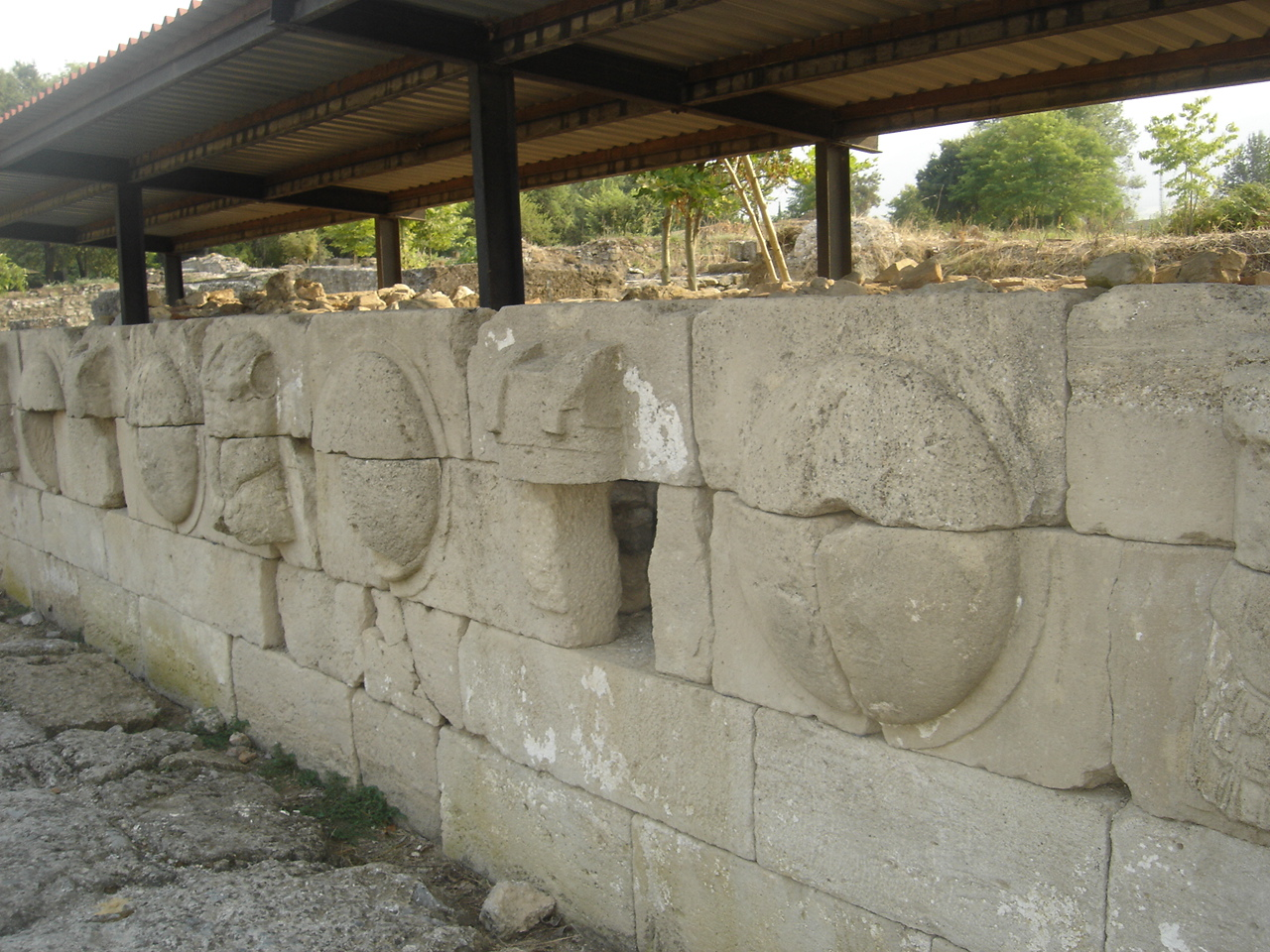
Archaeological Park of Dion, the shields devoted by Alexander the Great, over Battle of the Granicus

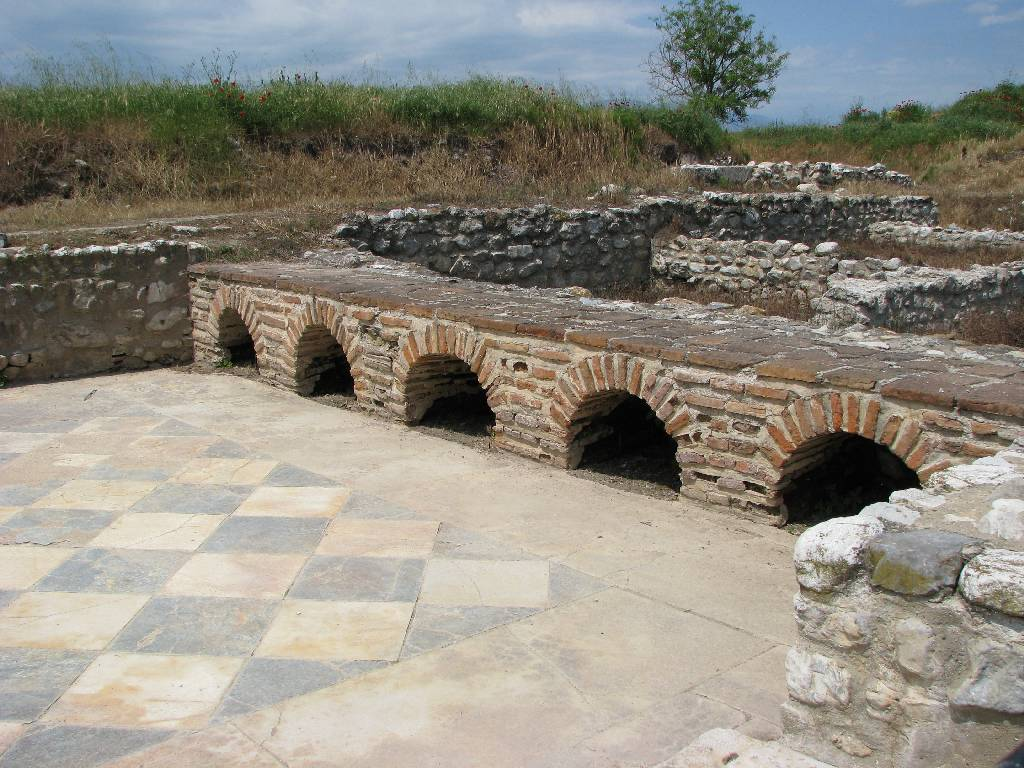
Archaeological Park of Dion

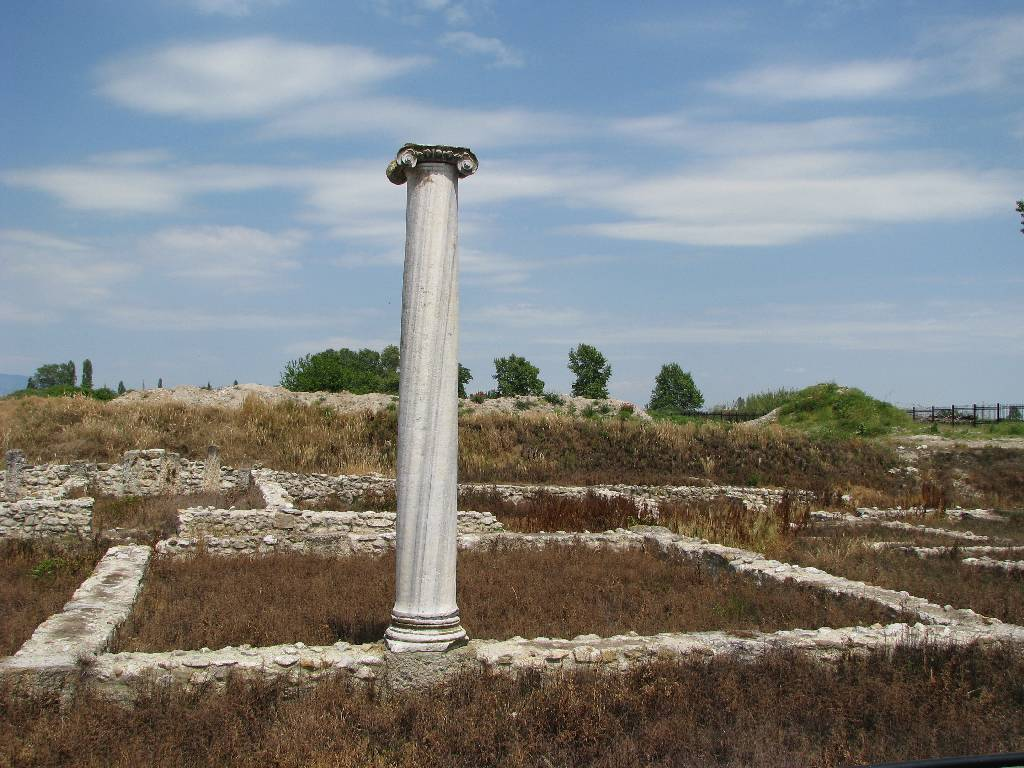
Archaeological Park of Dion

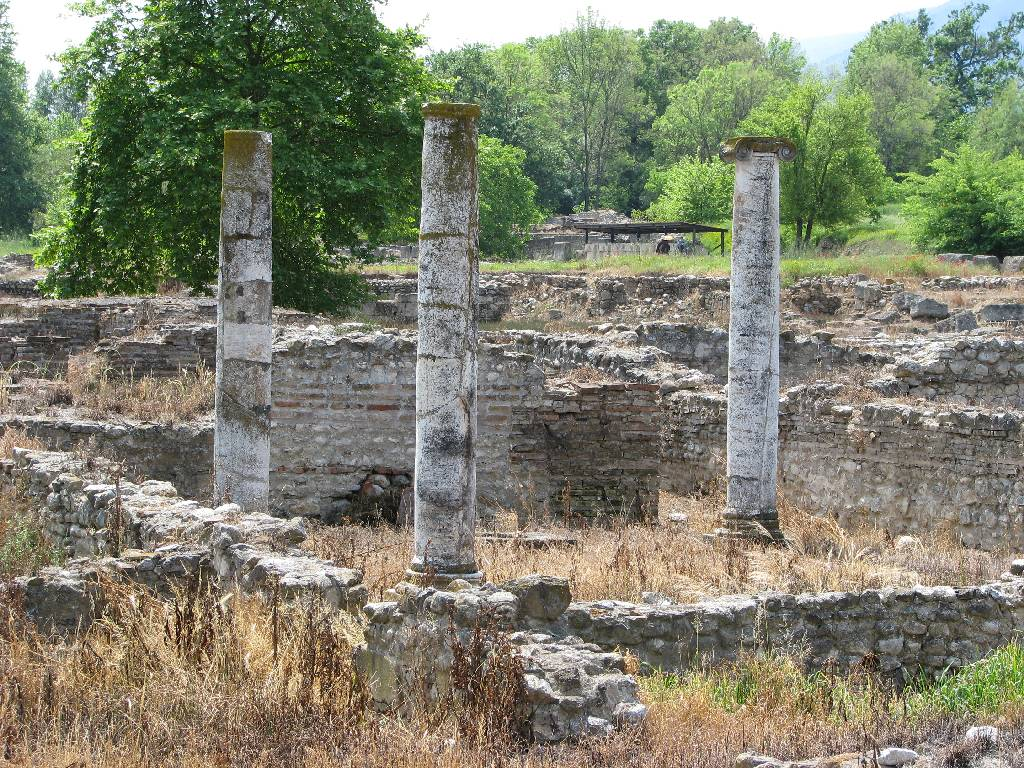
Archaeological Park of Dion

== See also ==
- Pierian Spring
- Pierian Sodality
- Pieria (mythology)
- List of settlements in the Regional Unit of Pieria
