= Agios Spyridonas =

Agios Spyridonas (Greek meaning Saint Spyridon) may refer to the following places in Greece:

- Agios Spyridonas, Boeotia, a village in Boeotia
- Agios Spyridonas, Corfu, a beach and nature reserve in Corfu
- Agios Spyridonas, Phocis, a village in Phocis
- Agios Spyridonas, Pieria, a village in Pieria
- Agios Spiridonas (Limassol), a district of the Municipality of Limassol
