= Omonoia =

Omonoia (Greek: ομόνοια) means concord, harmony, or unity, which may refer to:

- Omonoia Square, one of Athens' main squares
- Omonoia Station, the subway station located on the square
- Omonoia, Athens, the neighborhood around it
- Omonoia (organization), a political and cultural organization of the Greeks living in Albania
- AC Omonia, a Cypriot football/soccer team
- Omonoia, Limassol, a quarter of Limassol, Cyprus
