= Vrontou, Pieria =

Vrontou Βροντού
- Community
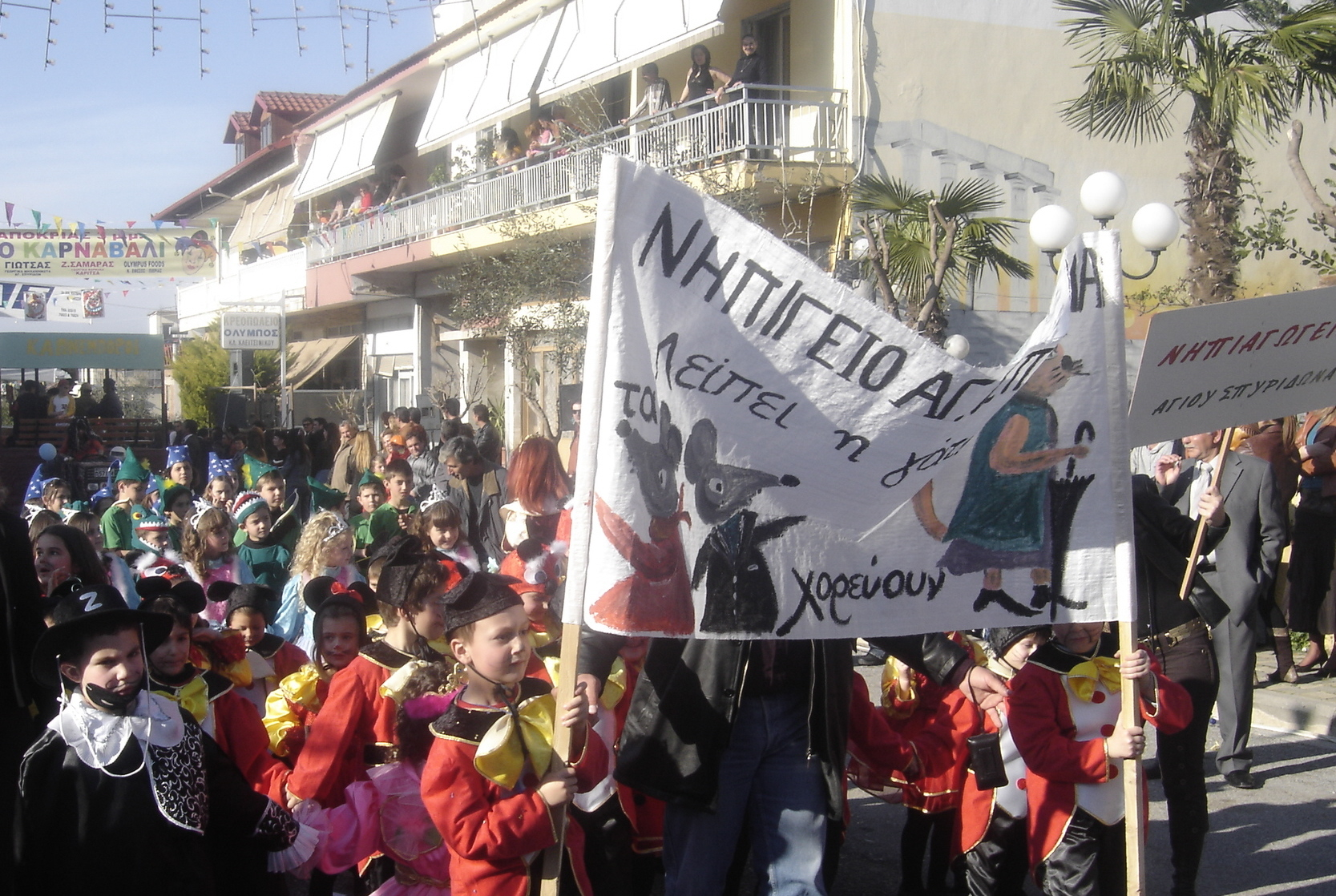
- The carnival of Vrontou

- Location within Greece
- Coordinates: 40°12′N 22°26′E
- Country: Greece
- Administrative region: Central Macedonia
- Regional unit: Pieria
- Municipality: Dion-Olympos
- Municipal unit: Dion

Population (2021)
  - Community: 1,762
- Time zone: UTC+2 (EET)
  - Summer (DST): UTC+3 (EEST)

Vrontou (Greek: Βροντού) is a town of the former Municipality of Dio, which is part of the municipality of Dion-Olympos, in the Pieria regional unit, Central Macedonia, Greece, at an altitude of 120 meters, with 1,762 inhabitants (census 2021). There are several medieval and post-medieval churches in Vrontou.

An event is the carnival of Vrontou, that take place every year.
