= Karitsa, Pieria =

Karitsa Καρίτσα
- Community
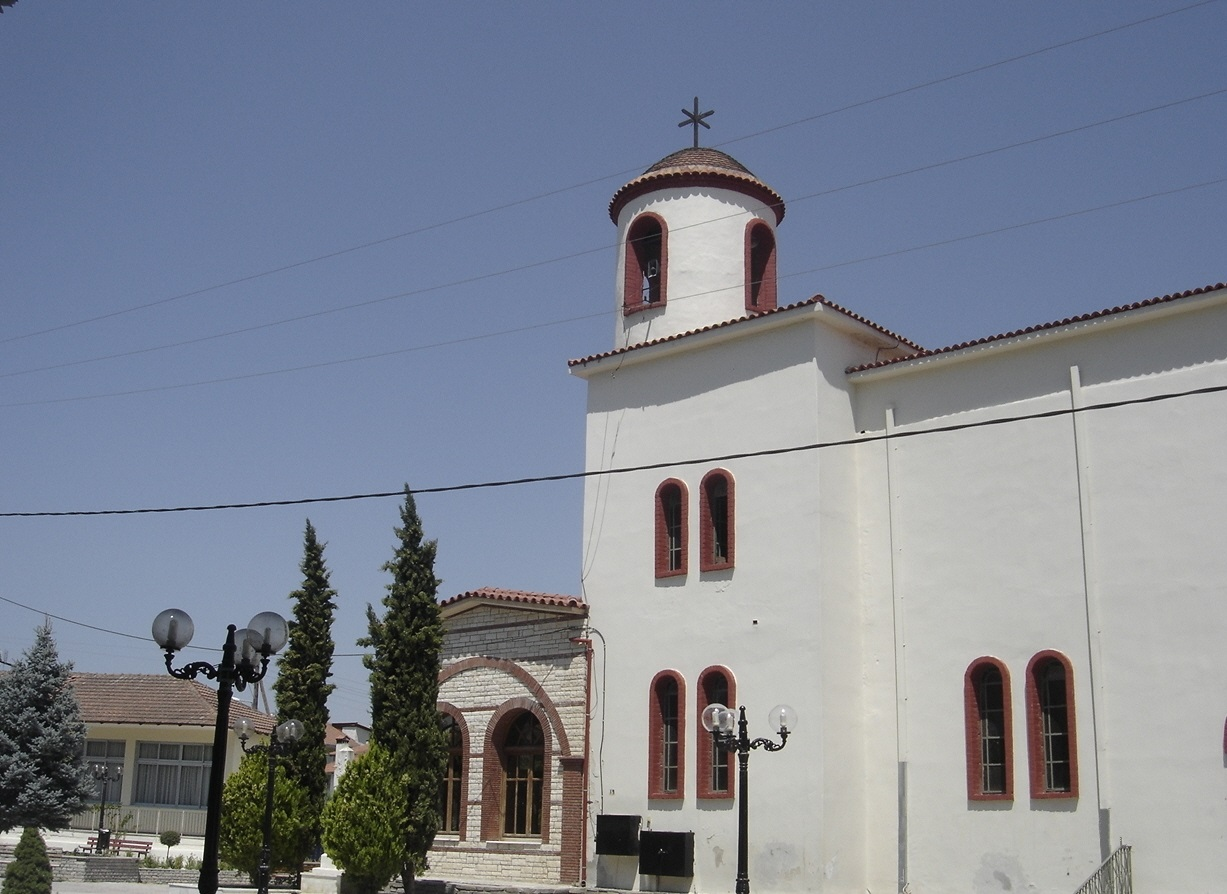
- The Church of Agios Dimitrios in Karitsa

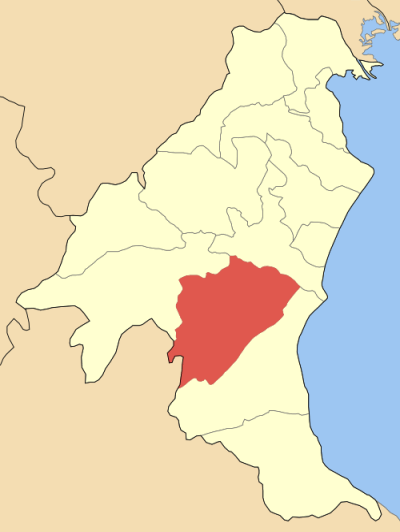
- Location within the regional unit

- Location within Greece
- Coordinates: 40°11′15″N 22°28′55″E
- Country: Greece
- Administrative region: Central Macedonia
- Regional unit: Pieria
- Municipality: Dio-Olympos
- Municipal unit: Dio
- Elevation: 20 m (66 ft)

Population (2021)
  - Community: 1,843
- Time zone: UTC+2 (EET)
  - Summer (DST): UTC+3 (EEST)
- Postal code: 601 00
- Area code: 23510
- Vehicle registration: KN

Karitsa (Greek: Καρίτσα) is a lowland Aromanian (Vlach) town of the former Municipality of Dio, which is part of the municipality of Dio-Olympos, in the Pieria regional unit, Central Macedonia, Greece. The population was 1,843 people as of 2021. It is located 13 km south of Katerini.

Livestock farming and tobacco growing are the main occupations of the residents. Also produced is corn, beet, endive, kiwi, and cereals.
