= Nea Efesos =

Village in Pieria, Greece

Nea Efesos Νέα Έφεσος
- Community
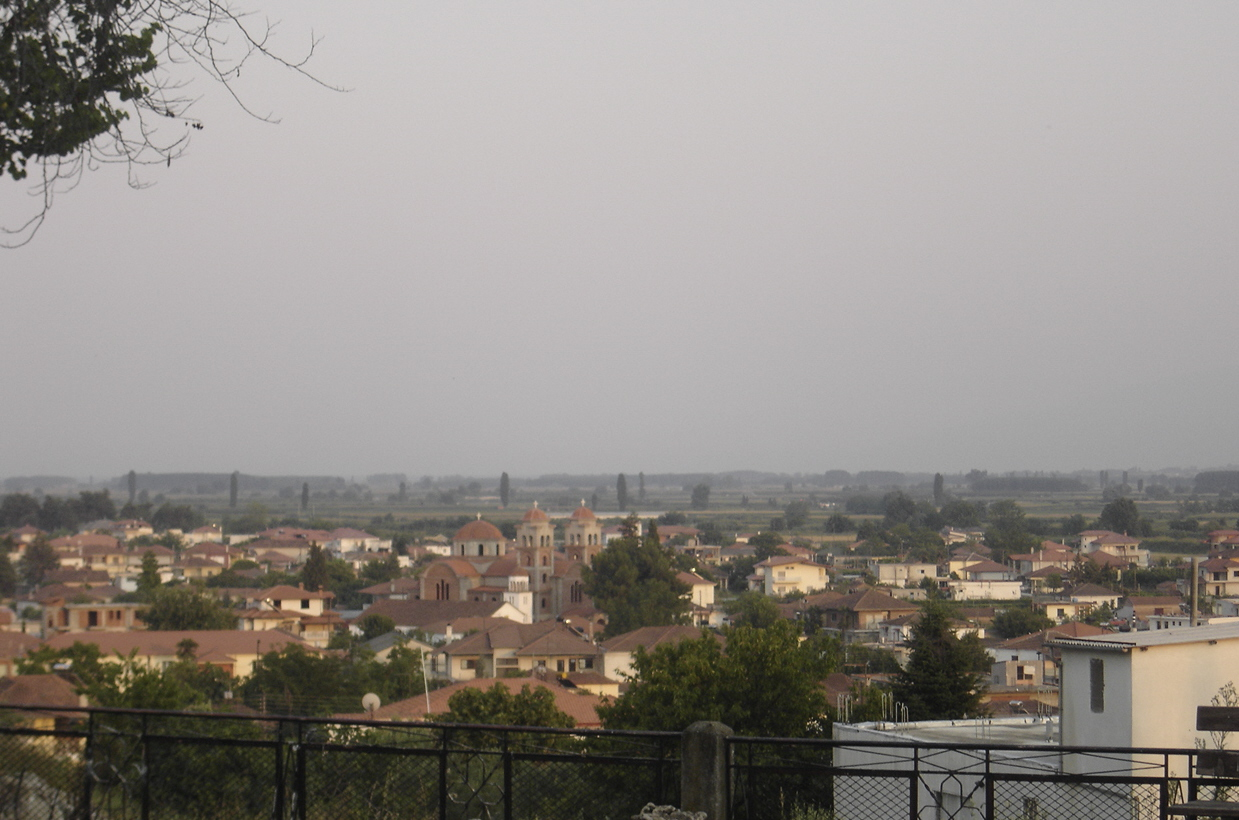
- View of Nea Efessos

- Location within Greece
- Coordinates: 40°13′39″N 22°30′00″E
- Country: Greece
- Administrative region: Central Macedonia
- Regional unit: Pieria
- Municipality: Dio-Olympos
- Elevation: 20 m (66 ft)

Population (2021)
  - Community: 1,328
- Time zone: UTC+2 (EET)
  - Summer (DST): UTC+3 (EEST)
- Postal code: 601 00
- Area code: 23510
- Vehicle registration: KN

Nea Efesos (Greek: Νέα Έφεσος) is a rural settlement of the former Municipality of Dio, which is part of the municipality of Dio-Olympos, in the Pieria regional unit, Central Macedonia, Greece. Nea Efesos has 1,328 inhabitants as of 2021. In 2007 a weather station was installed in the area.

== Name ==
The settlement was recently renamed Νέα Έφεσος (New Ephesus), because of the settlement of Greeks from the region of ancient Ephesus as a result of the 1923 Greek-Turkish population exchange. Before the name change, it was called Στουπί (Stoupi).

== History ==
In the area of present-day Νέα Έφεσος (Nea Efesos / New Ephesus), there once stood the ancient city of Ακεσαμεναί (Akesamenai), said to have been founded by Ακεσαμενός (Akesamenos), who is mentioned by Όμηρος (Homer). In the same region lies the burial mound of the 25,000 Macedonians who were killed in the Μάχη της Πύδνας (Battle of Pydna).

During the Byzantine era, the village was located on the slope of Τούμπα (Toumba Hill) and was known as “Παλιόχωρα” (“Old Village”). Later, following the intervention of the local bishop, the inhabitants left the area because of the high child mortality rates reported there and moved closer to the marshlands.

During Ottoman rule, Νέα Έφεσος (Nea Efesos) was a small settlement known as “Σπη” (Spi), a name believed to come from a local plant that absorbed water from the swampy terrain. The bishop Παρθένιος Βαρδάκας (Parthenios Vardakas), writing before 1912, described the village as lying in the fertile plain of Αίσωνας (Aisonas) near an iron bridge built by the Ottomans. He also noted that the name “Στουπί” (Stoupi) — shortened to “Σπη” (Spi) — came from the local production of hemp fibers (“στουπί” / stoupi). These fibers were used to make ship ropes, fishing nets, coarse linen fabrics, and sails.

The traveler Λέων Εζέ (Léon Heuzey) also referred to the village as “Στουπί” (Stoupi). He described it as having around 50 houses and an old church dedicated to Άγιος Πρόδρομος (Saint John the Baptist). Marble monuments and Byzantine inscriptions had reportedly been discovered there as well.

According to Τρύφων Ευαγγελίδης (Tryfon Evangelidis), Σπι (Spi) had around 230 inhabitants in about 1910.

At the beginning of the 20th century, the village consisted of roughly 60 houses with a population of around 380 people, most of whom worked in agriculture and livestock farming.

In 1924, the first group of refugees from Έφεσος (Ephesus) in Asia Minor settled around Τούμπα (Toumba Hill), followed by a second group in 1927. In 1926 the village was officially named “Στουπί” (Stoupi), and in 1953 it received its current official name, Νέα Έφεσος (Nea Efesos / New Ephesus).
