= Dion, Pieria =

Village in Central Macedonia, Greece

Dion Δίον
- Municipal unit
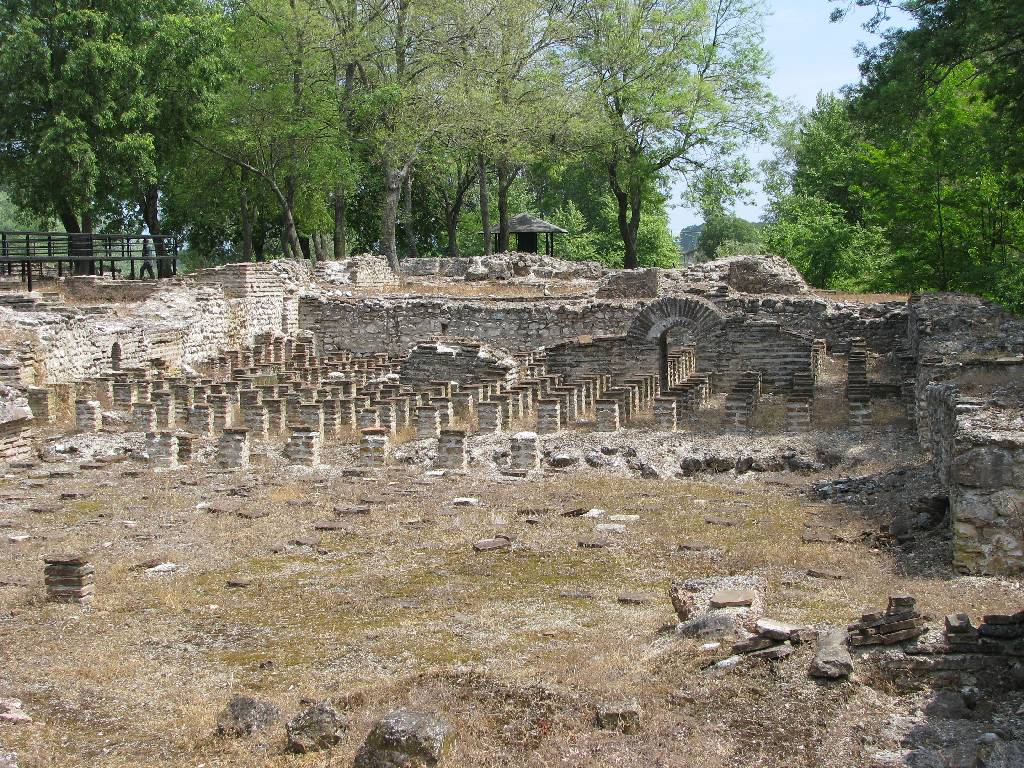
- Hypocaust of ancient public baths

- Location within the regional unit

- Location within Greece
- Coordinates: 40°10′N 22°29′E
- Country: Greece
- Administrative region: Central Macedonia
- Regional unit: Pieria
- Municipality: Dio-Olympos

Area
  - Municipal unit: 172.743 km^{2} (66.696 sq mi)
  - Community: 31.375 km^{2} (12.114 sq mi)
- Elevation: 40 m (130 ft)

Population (2021)
  - Municipal unit: 9,067
  - Municipal unit density: 52.49/km^{2} (135.9/sq mi)
  - Community: 1,268
  - Community density: 40.41/km^{2} (104.7/sq mi)
- Time zone: UTC+2 (EET)
  - Summer (DST): UTC+3 (EEST)
- Postal code: 601 00
- Area code: 23510
- Vehicle registration: KN

Dion (Greek: Δίον; (Note: Romanization: Díon, Modern Greek: [ˈði.on]) Ancient Greek: Δῖον; (Note: Romanization: Dȋon, Ancient: [dîːon]) Latin: Dium) is a village and municipal unit in the municipality of Dion-Olympos in the Pieria regional unit, Greece. (Note: Prior to Greece's 2011 local government reform, Dion was a municipality. As part of that reform the current municipality of Dion-Olympos was created by combining Dion with the municipalities of East Olympos and Litochoro, all of which are now regional units of Dion-Olympos.) It is located at the foot of Mount Olympus at a distance of 17 km from the capital city of Katerini.

It is best known for its great ancient Macedonian sanctuary of Zeus and the ancient city, much of which is visible in the Archaeological Park of Dion and the Archaeological Museum of Dion.

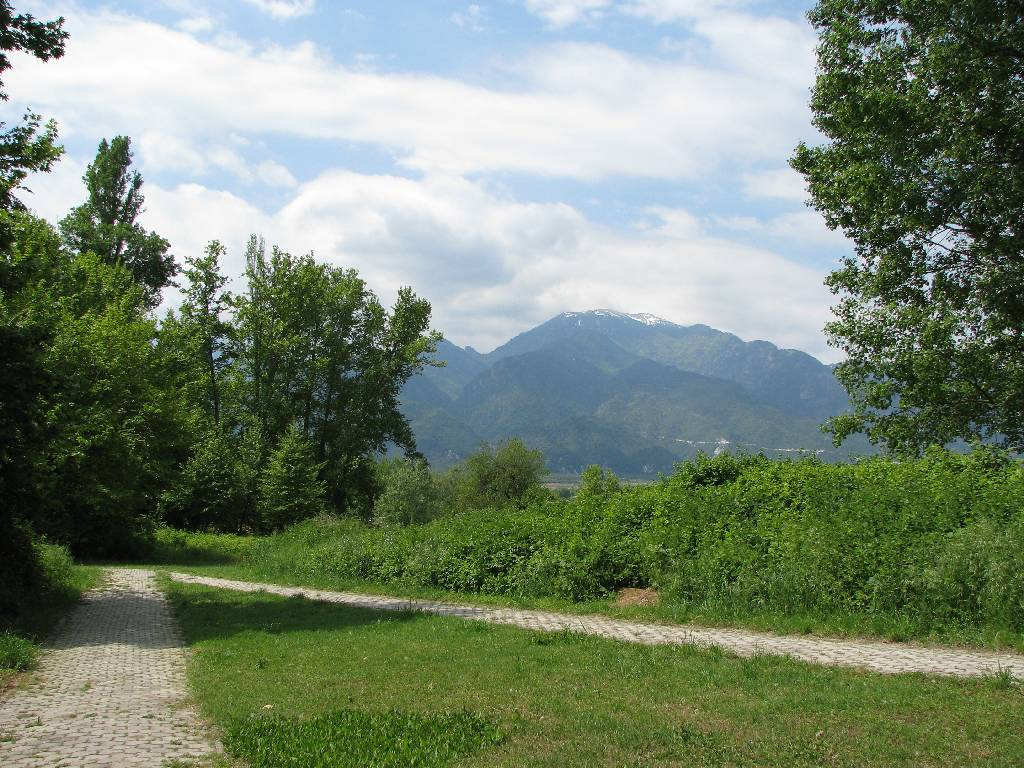
View of Mount Olympus

== History ==
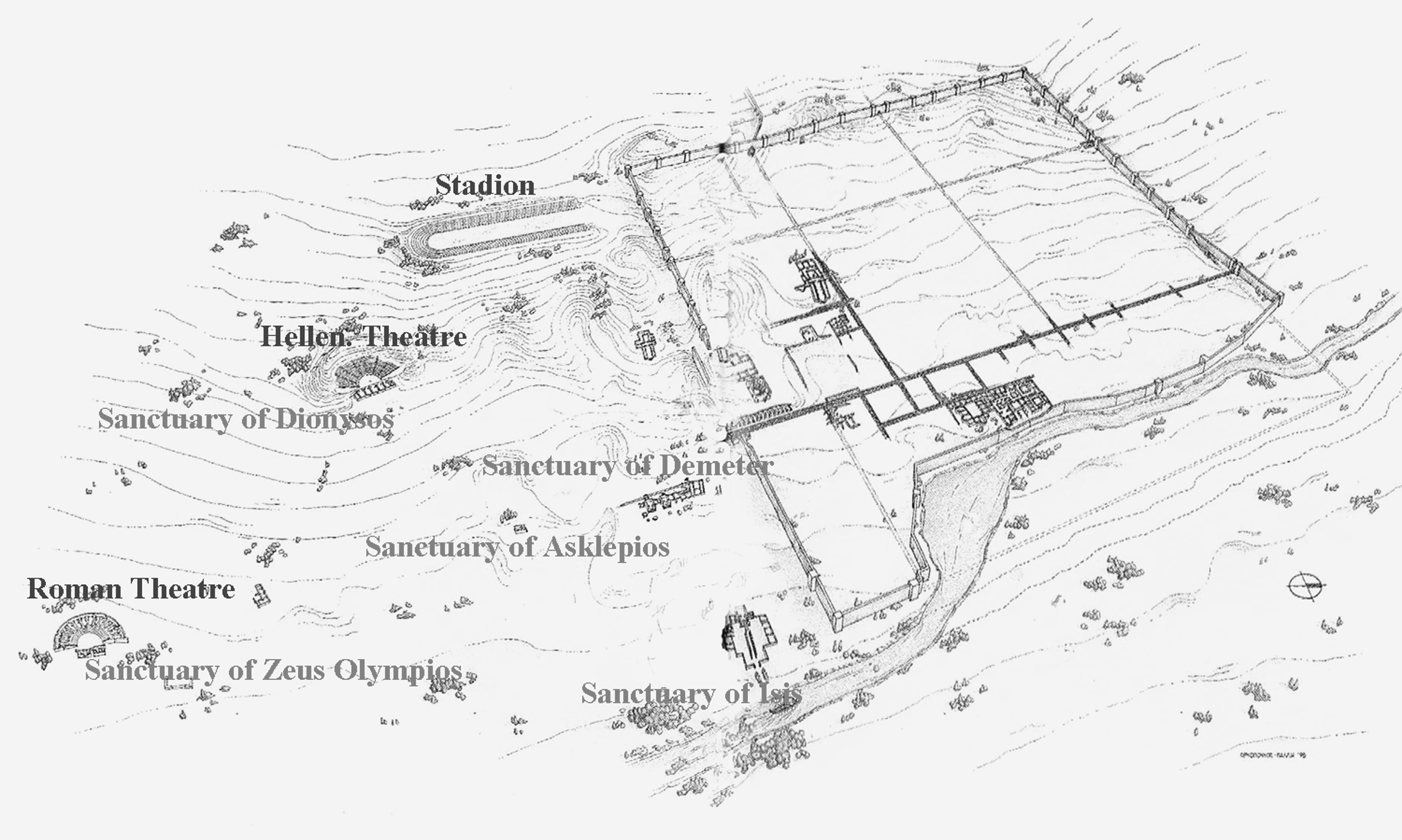
Plan of Dion. The sanctuaries and the city (Archive of the excavation of the Aristotle University of Thessaloniki/Drawing of Orkopoulos – Palli 1995) [Pandermalis (1997), p. 14-15].

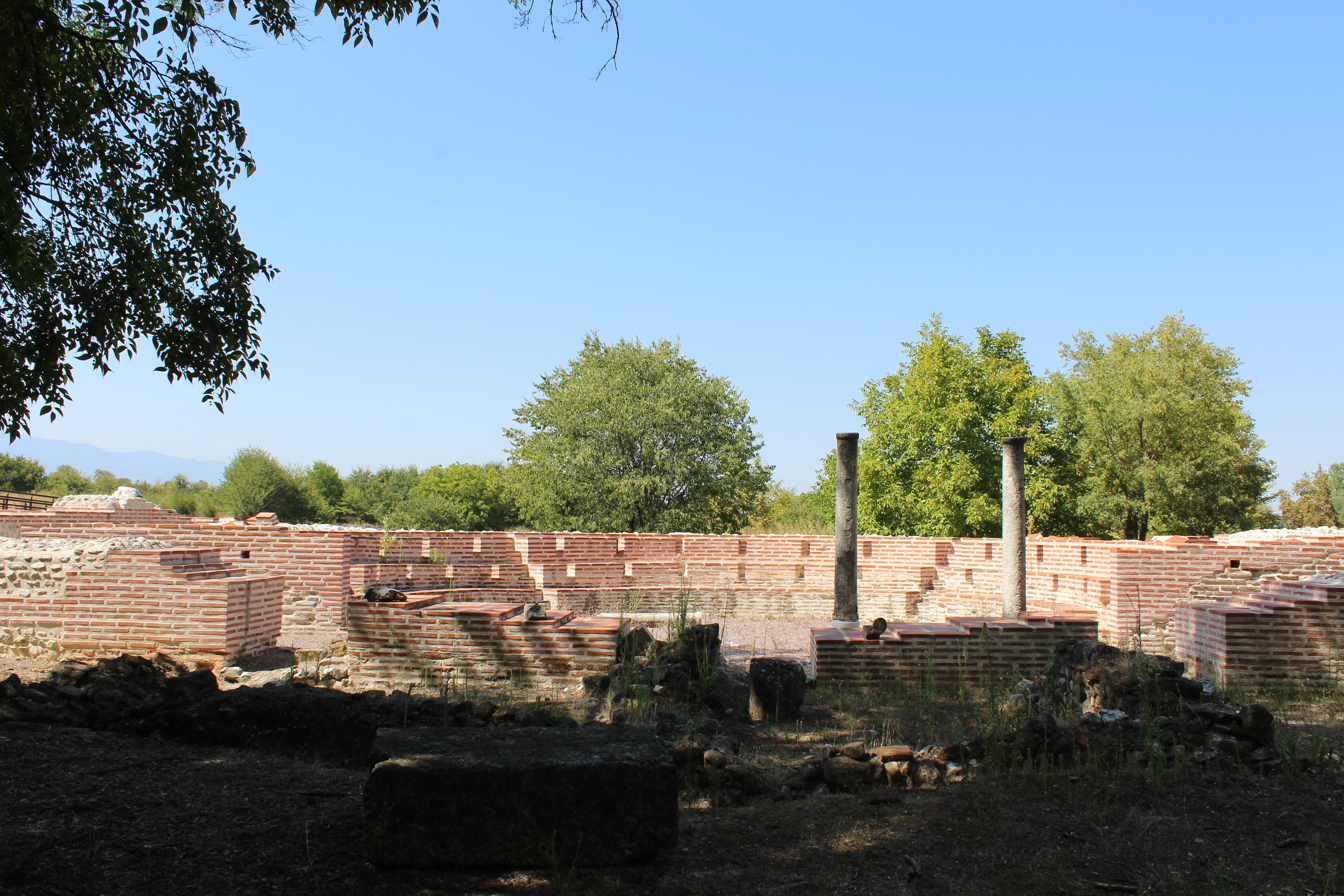
Ancient Thermes

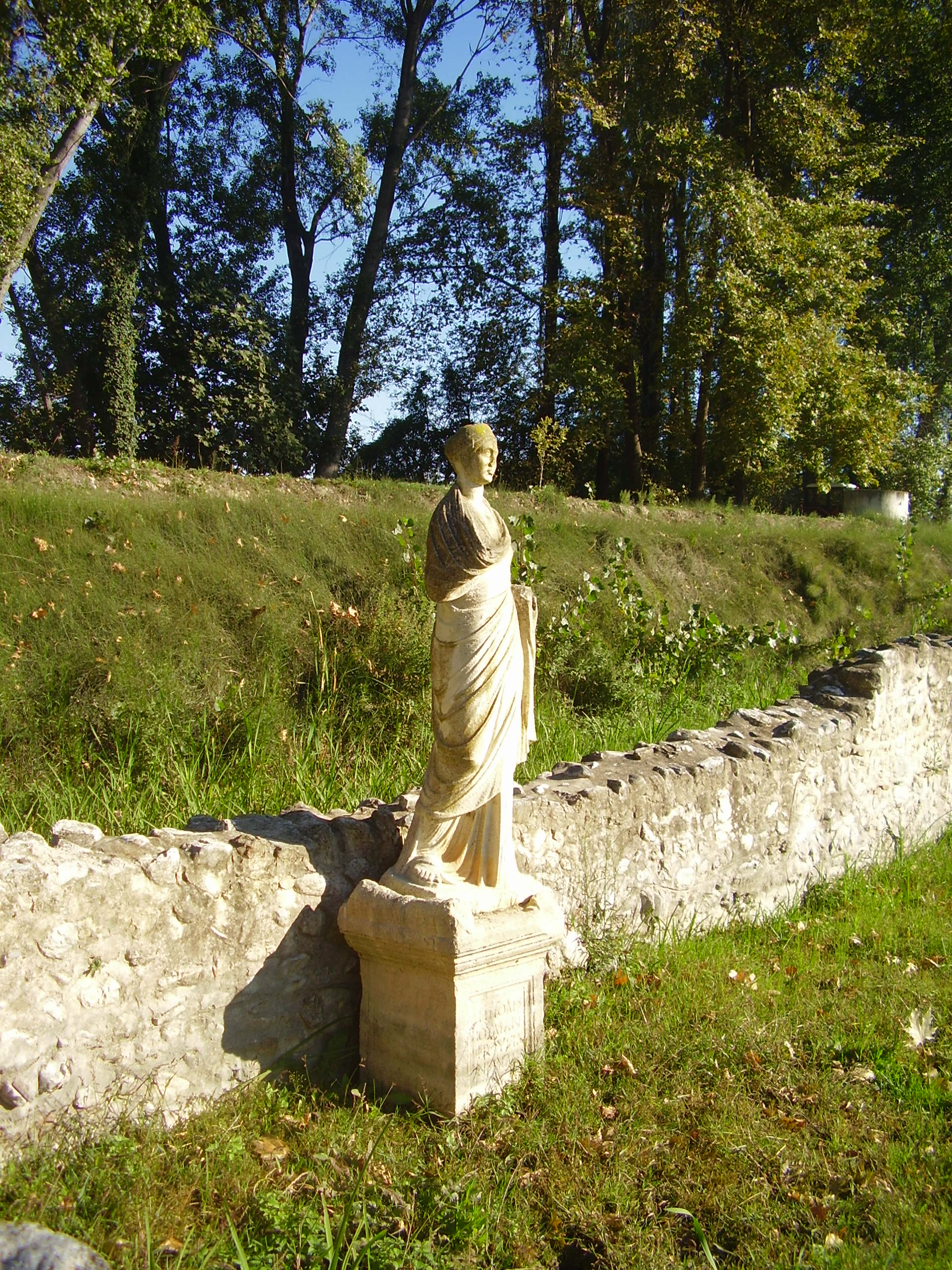
View of a statue, Sanctuary of Isis.

The ancient city owes its name to the most important Macedonian sanctuary dedicated to Zeus (Dios, "of Zeus"), leader of the gods who dwelt on Mount Olympus; as recorded by Hesiod's Catalogue of Women, Thyia, daughter of Deucalion, bore Zeus two sons, Magnes and Makedon, eponyms of Magnetes and Makedones, who dwelt in Pieria at the foot of Mount Olympus. Hence from very ancient times, a large altar had been set up for the worship of Olympian Zeus and his daughters, the Muses, in a unique environment characterised by rich vegetation, towering trees, countless springs and a navigable river. For this reason Dion was the "sacred place" of the Ancient Macedonians. It was the place where the kings made splendid sacrifices to celebrate the new year of the Macedonian calendar at the end of September. In the Spring, purification rites of the army and victory feasts were held.

The first mention of Dion in history comes from Thucydides, who reports that it was the first city reached by the Spartan general Brasidas after crossing from Thessaly into Macedon on his way through the realm of his ally Perdiccas II during his expedition against the Athenian colonies of Thrace in 424 BC. According to Diodorus Siculus, it was Archelaus I who, at the end of the 5th century BC when the Macedonian state acquired great power and emerged onto the stage of history, gave the city and its sanctuary their subsequent importance by instituting a nine-day festival of games that included athletic and dramatic competitions in honor of Zeus and the Muses, whose organisation was overseen by the Macedonian kings themselves.

Philip II and Alexander the Great celebrated victories here, and Alexander assembled his armies and performed magnificent sacrifices here on the eve of his campaign to Asia in 334 BC.

Many ancient authors speak of the sculptural bronze masterpiece by Lysippos made for Alexander depicting 25 mounted companions who fell at the Battle of the Granicus and later taken to Rome by Metellus.

A city was built adjacent to the sacred sites that acquired monumental form during the reigns of Alexander the Great's successors and Cassander took a great interest in the city erecting strong walls and public buildings, so that in Hellenistic times Dion was renowned far and wide for its fortification and splendid monuments. Dion and its sanctuary was destroyed during the Social War in 219 BC by Aetolian invaders but was immediately rebuilt by Philip V. Many of the dedications from the sanctuary that had been destroyed were buried in pits, including royal inscriptions and treaties, and these have been discovered recently.

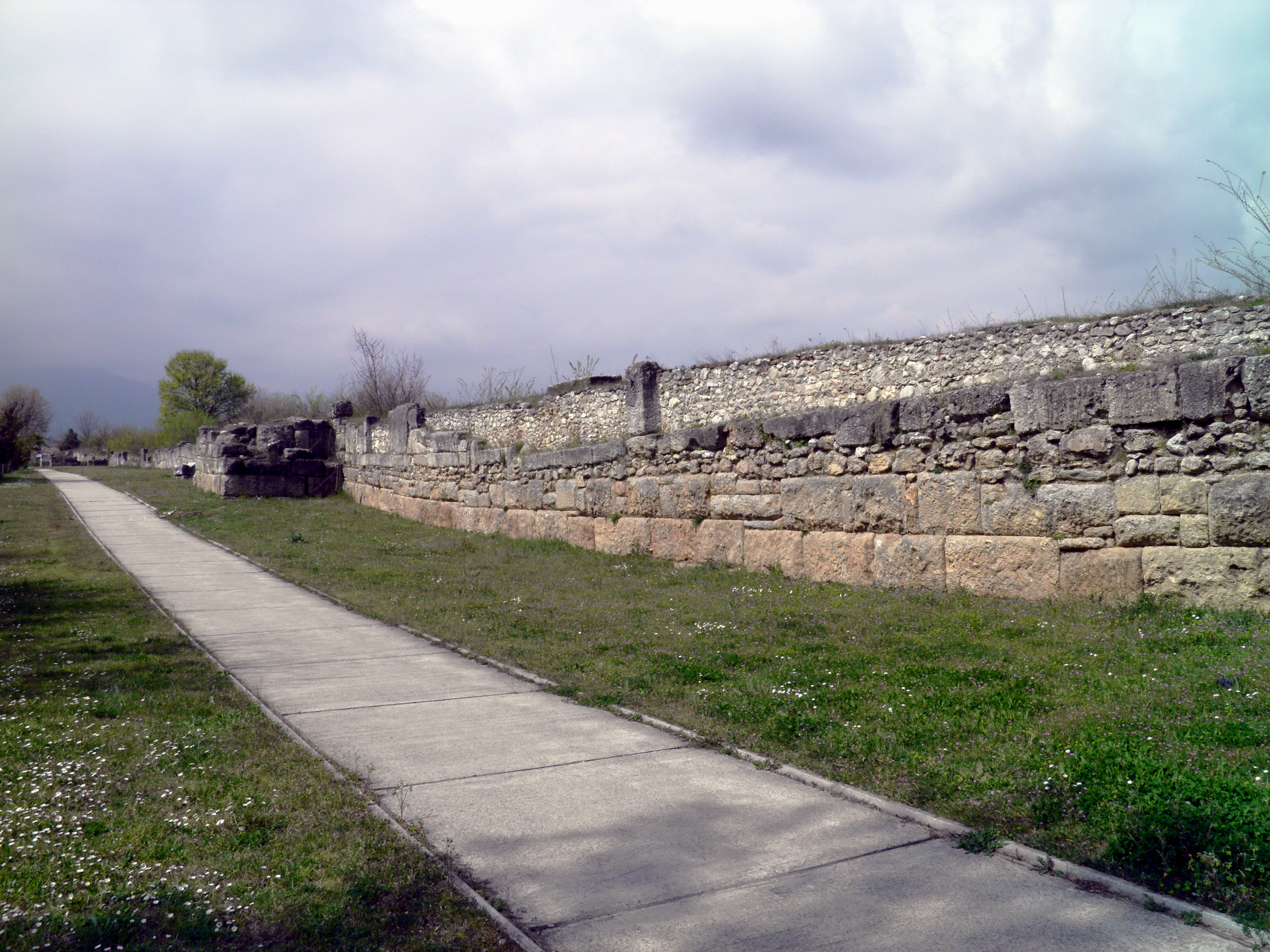
Fortification wall

It fell to the Romans in 169 BC and the city was given a new lease of life in 32/31 BC when Octavian founded the Colony of COLONIA JULIA AUGUSTA DIENSIS here. Coins of colonial Dion survive. It experienced its second heyday during the reigns of 2nd- and 3rd-century AD Roman emperors who were fond of Alexander the Great. Dion's final important period was in the 4th and 5th centuries AD when it became the seat of a bishopric. It was abandoned following major earthquakes and floods.

The modern village at the site was called Malathria until 1961, when it was renamed to Dion.

== Archaeology ==
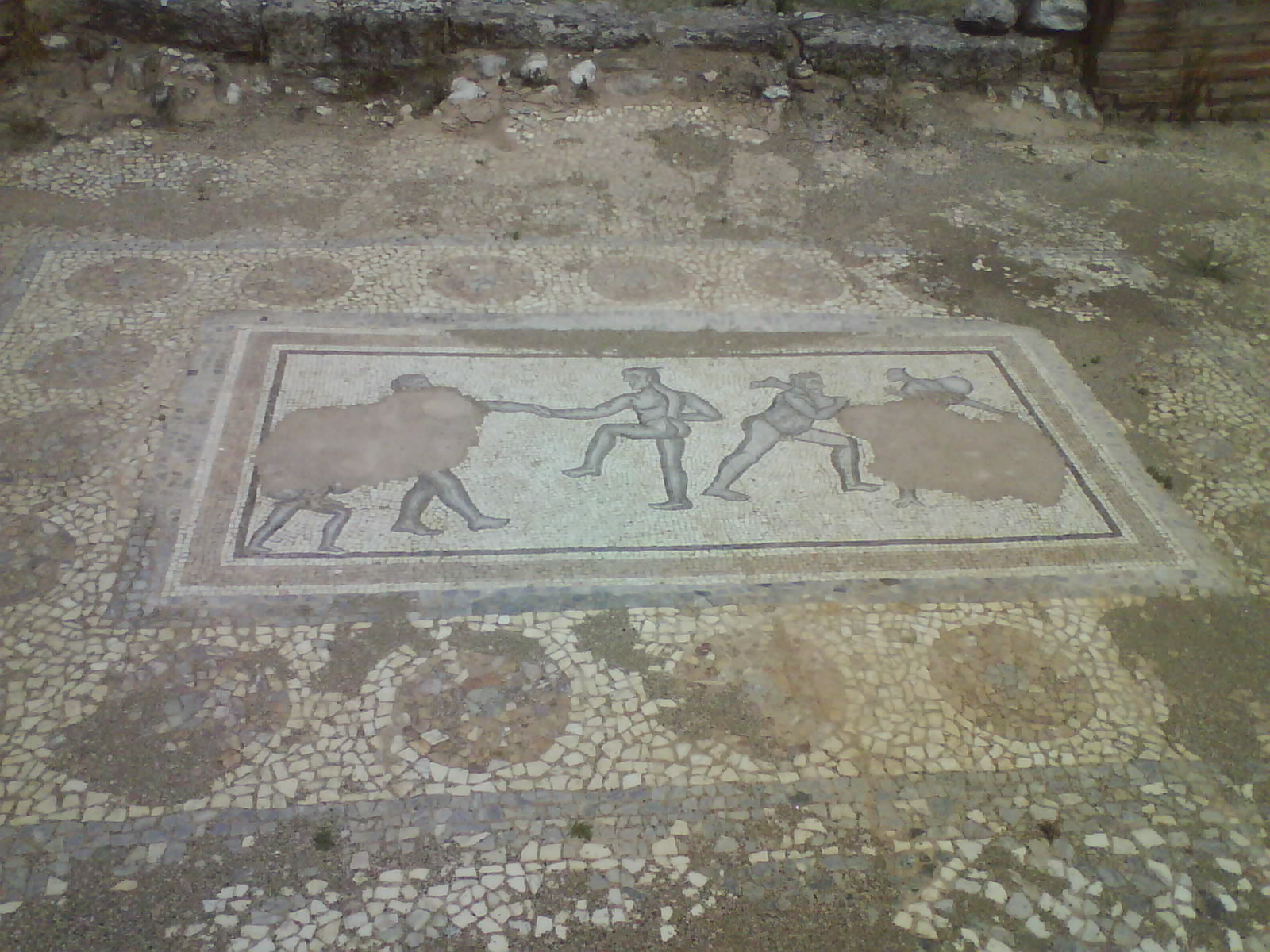
A mosaic floor

The site of ancient Dion was first identified by the English traveler William Martin Leake on December 2, 1806, in the ruins adjoining the village of Malathria. He published his discovery in the third volume of his Travels in Northern Greece in 1835. Léon Heuzey visited the site during his famous Macedonian archaeological mission of 1855 and again in 1861 when he also detected the ancient Leivithra. Later, the epigraphist G. Oikonomos published the first series of inscriptions. Nevertheless, systematic archaeological exploration did not begin until 1928. From then until 1931, G. Sotiriadis carried out a series of surveys, uncovering a 4th-century BC Macedonian tomb and an early Christian basilica. Excavations were not resumed until 1960 under the direction of G. Bakalakis in the area of the theatre and the wall. Since 1973, Professor Dimitrios Pandermalis of the Aristotle University of Thessaloniki has conducted archaeological research in the city.

Dion is the site of a large temple dedicated to Zeus, as well as a series of temples to Demeter and to Isis (the Egyptian goddess was a favorite of Alexander).

Excavation of the magnificent House of Dionysos revealed a mosaic of exceptionally fine quality.

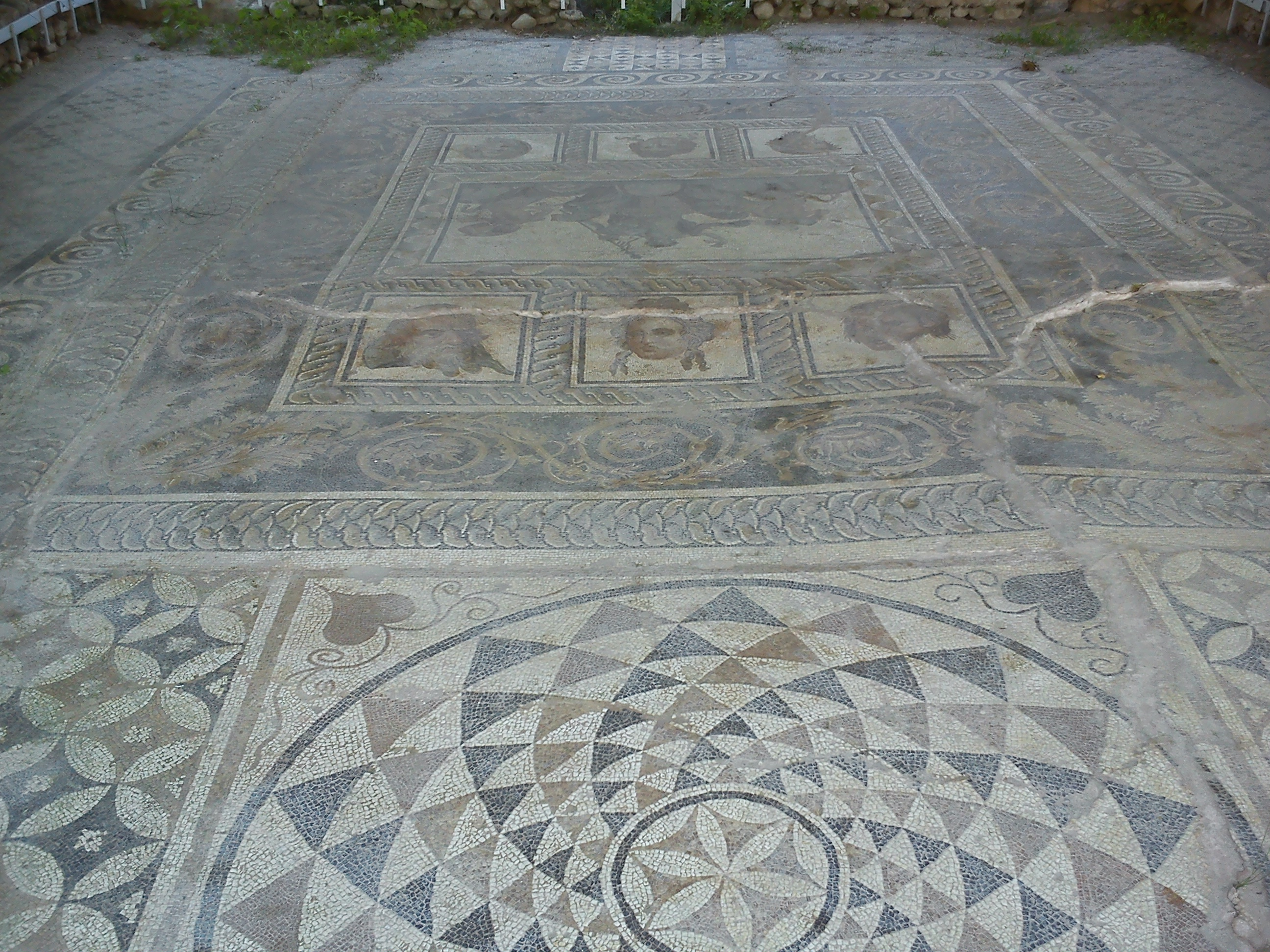
Dion House of Dionysos Mosaic

A rare and unusual find in the museum is a bronze "hydraulis" or hydraulic musical pipe organ found in a former workshop.

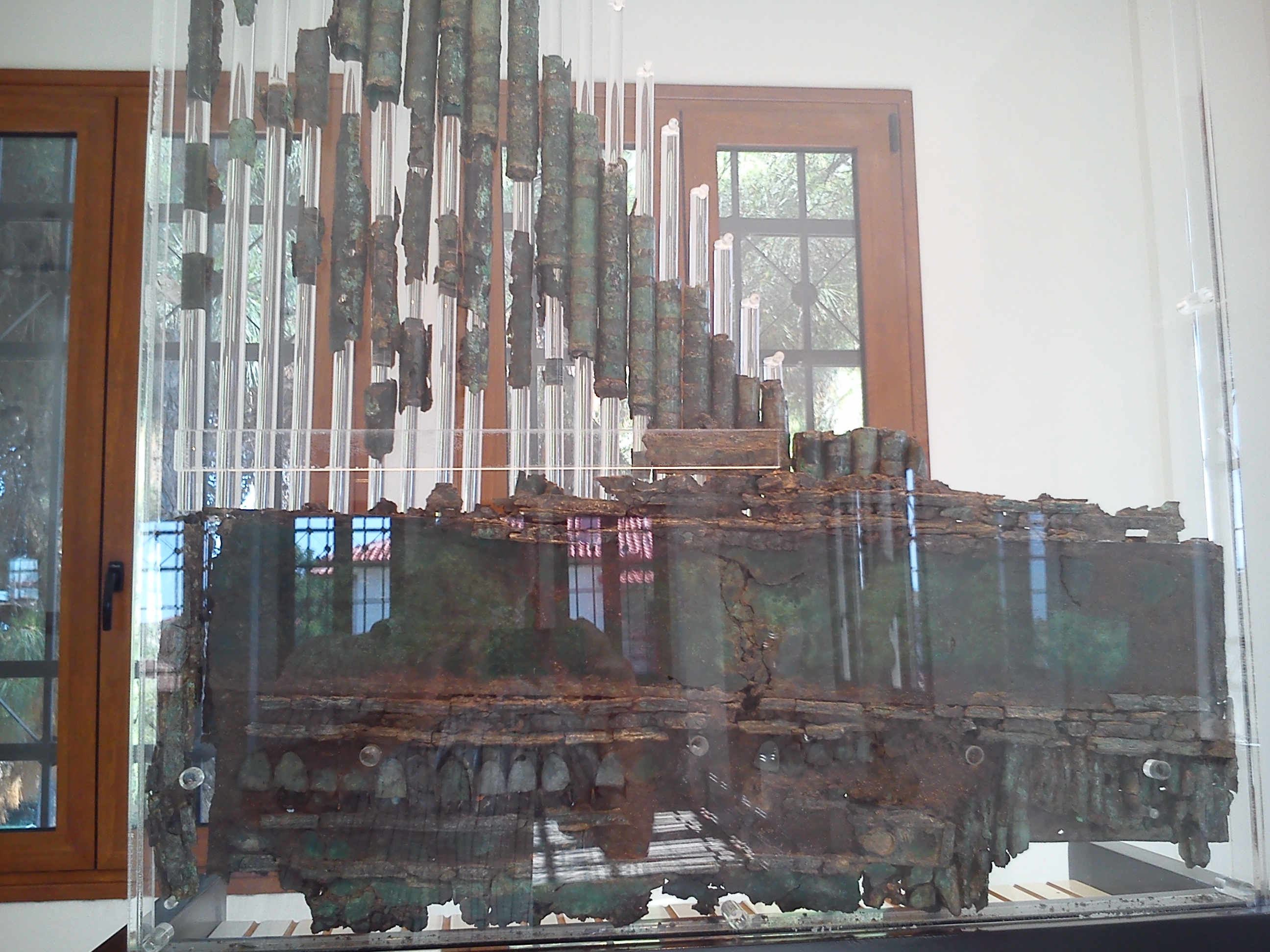
Dion hydraulis

In 2006, a statue of Hera was found built into the walls of the city. The statue, 2200 years old, had been used by the early Christians of Dion as filling for the city's defensive wall.

== Administration ==
In October 1992, the Municipality of Dion (Δήμος Δίου, Dimos Diou) was formed. At the 1997 Kapodistrias reform, it was expanded with the former communities Agios Spyridonas, Karitsa, Kondariotissa, Nea Efesos and Vrontou. The administrative center was in the village of Kondariotissa. As part of Greece's 2011 local government reform Dion merged with the former municipalities East Olympos and Litochoro to form the new municipality Dion-Olympos. Dion became a municipal unit of the newly formed municipality, and the former municipal districts became communities. The community of Dion consists of the village of the same name and Platanakia. The municipal unit has an area of 172.74 km^{2} (67 sq mi), the community 31.38 km^{2} (12 sq mi).

== Historical population ==
Year	Community population	Municipal unit population
1981	1,236	-
1991	1,149	9,876
2001	1,314	10,885
2011	1,424	10,066
2021	1,268	9,067

== Gallery ==
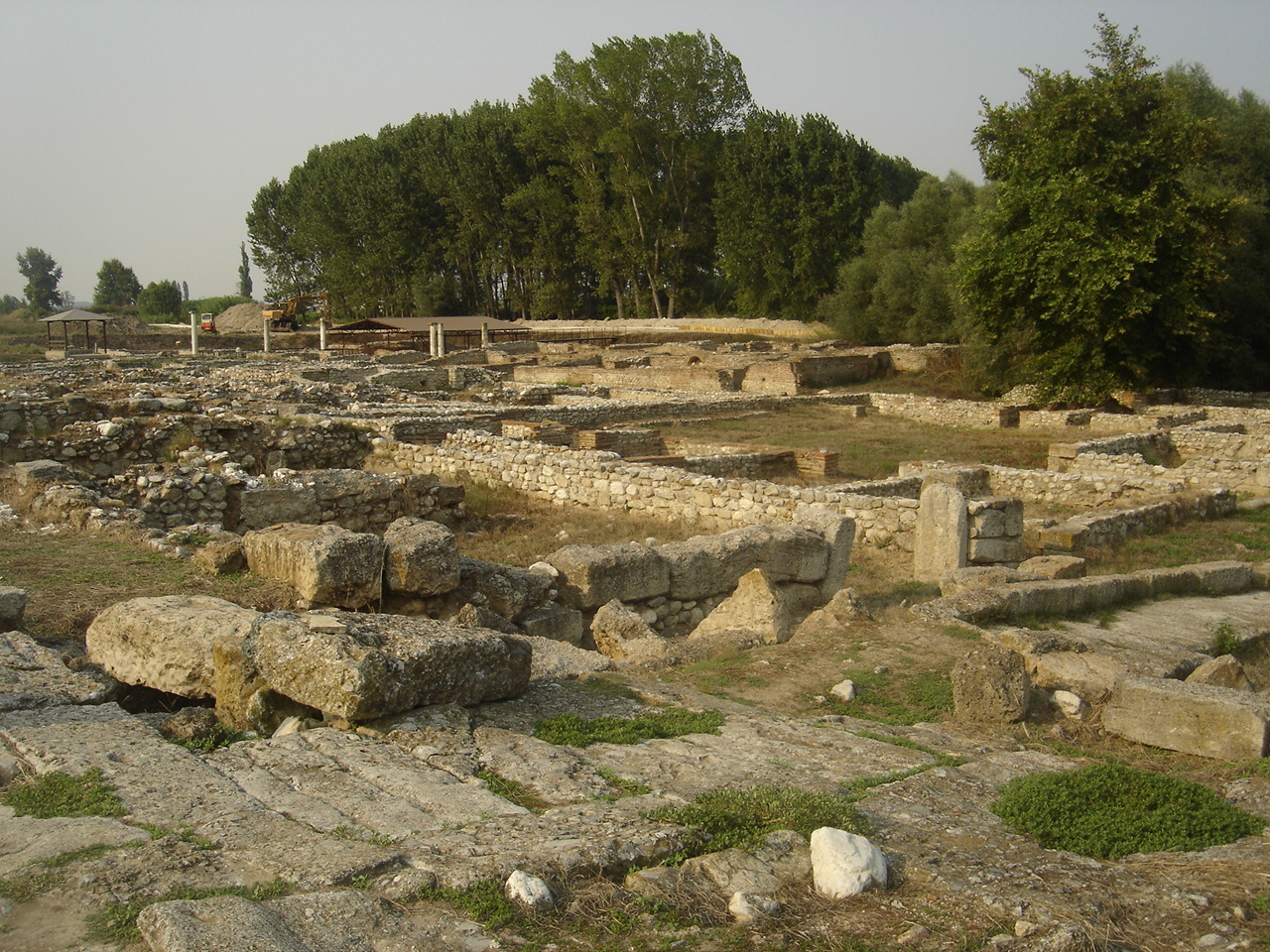
View of the archeological site

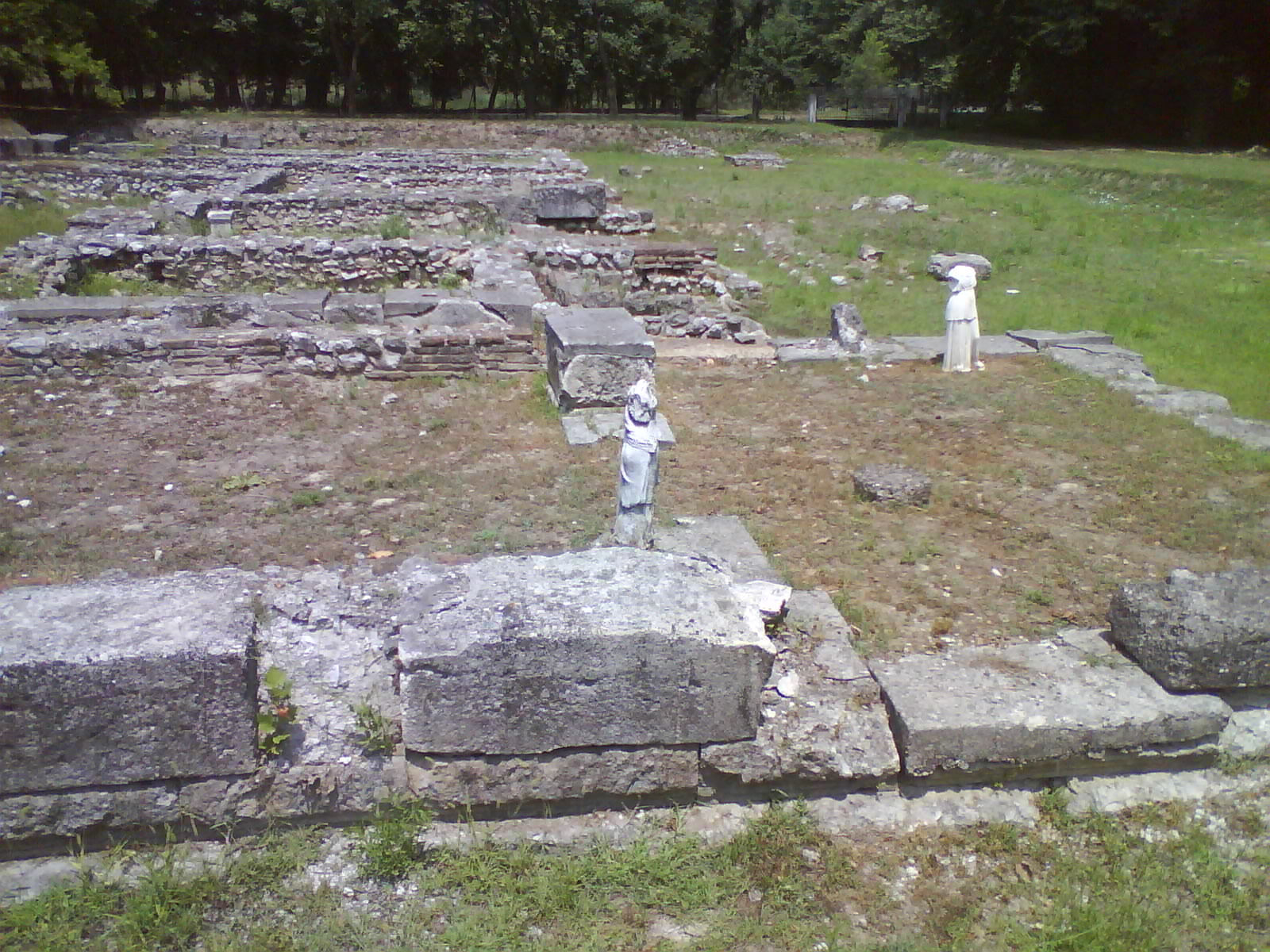
Ruins at the archaeological site

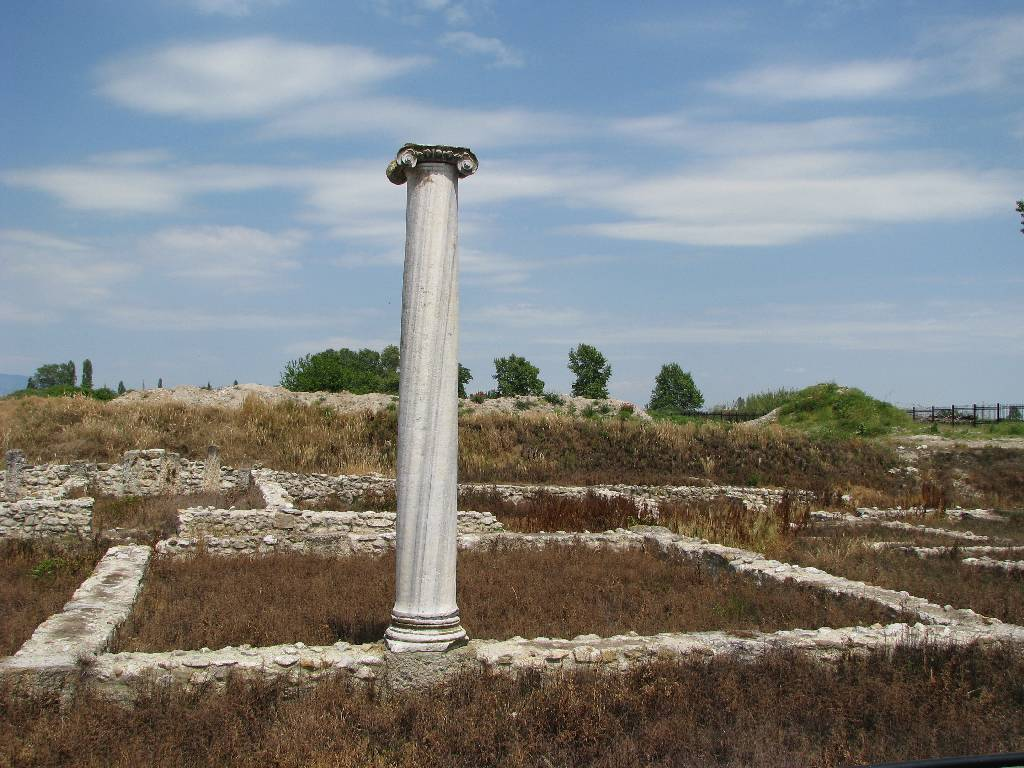
Ancient column

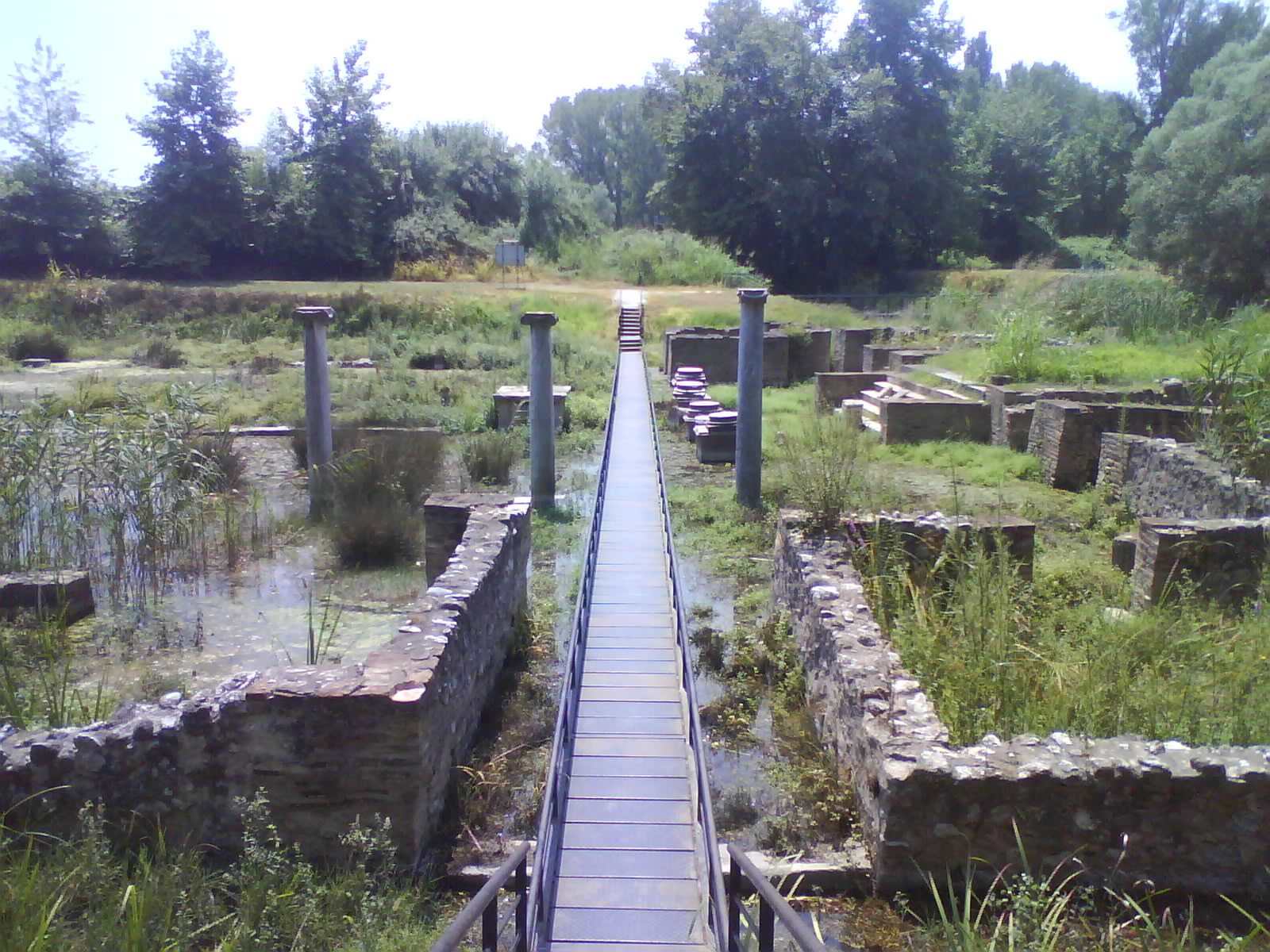
Sanctuary of Isis

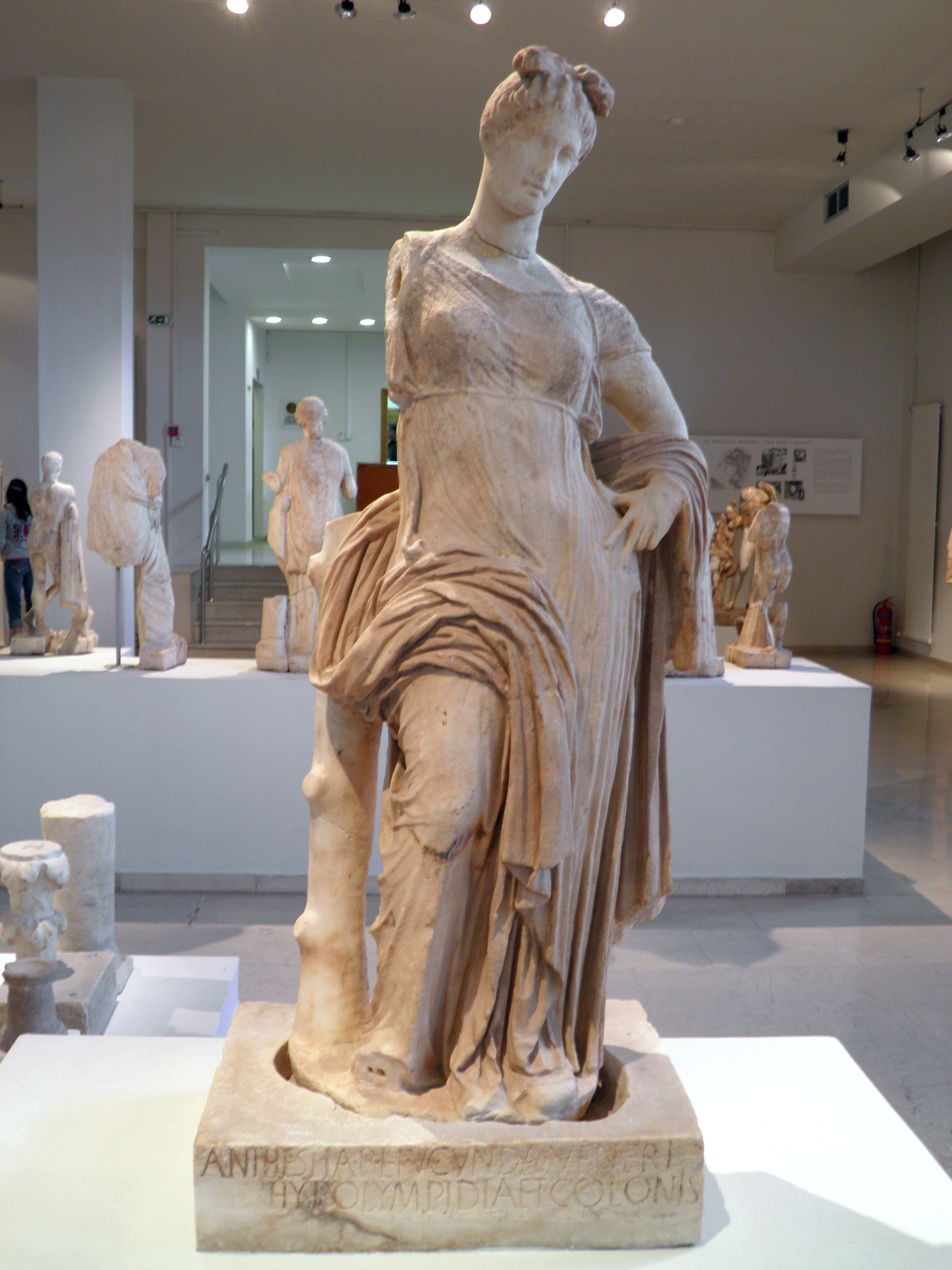
Aphrodite Hypolympidia statue.

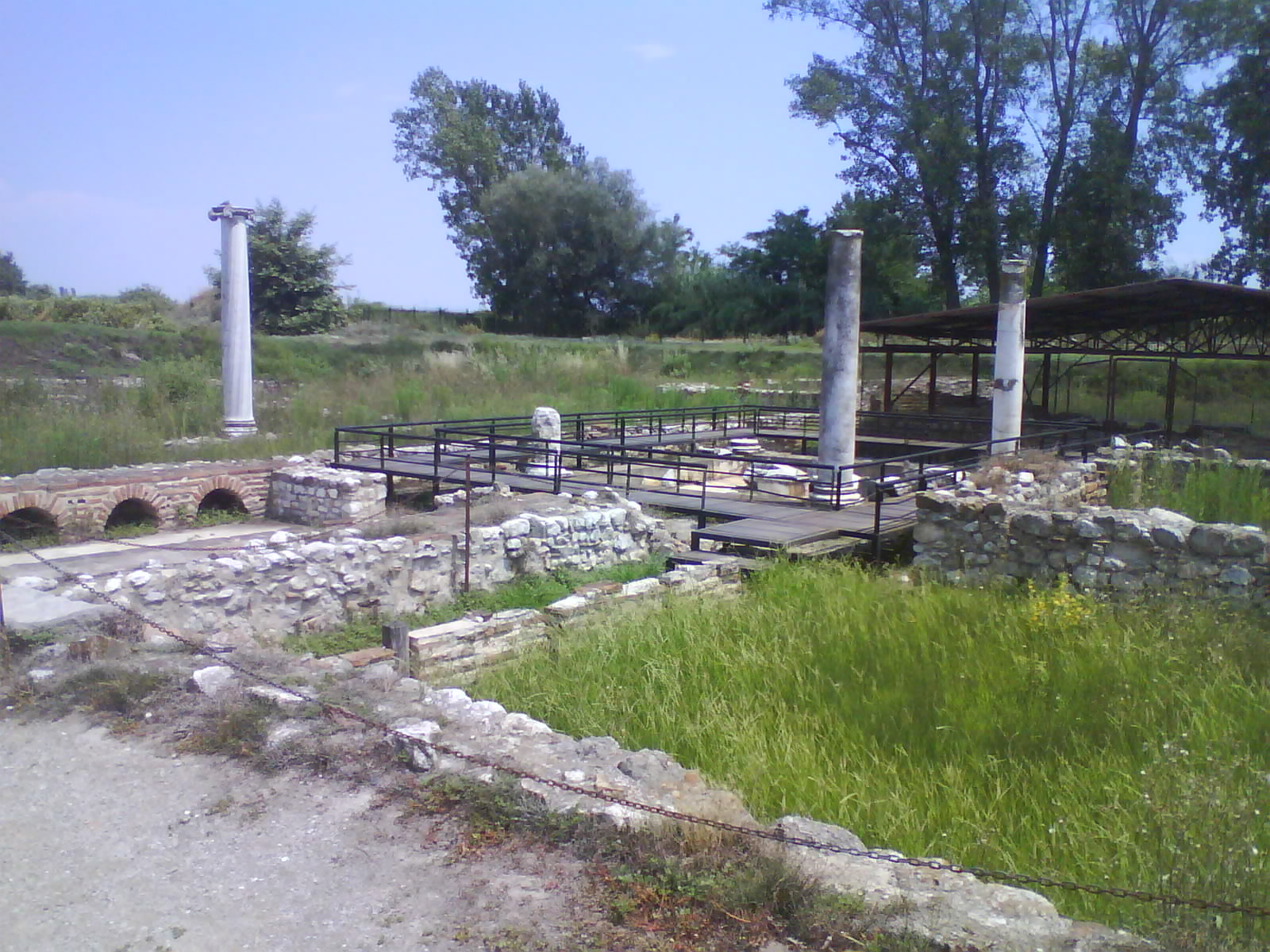
View of the villa of Dionysus containing the large Dionysus mosaic

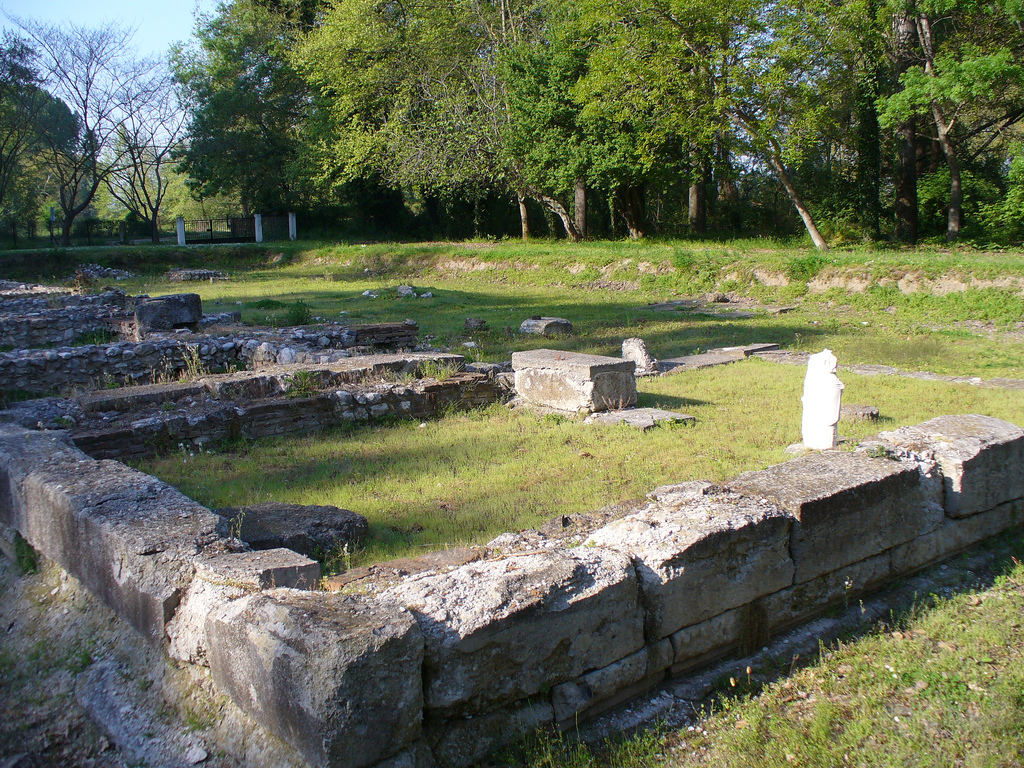
Sanctuary of Demeter

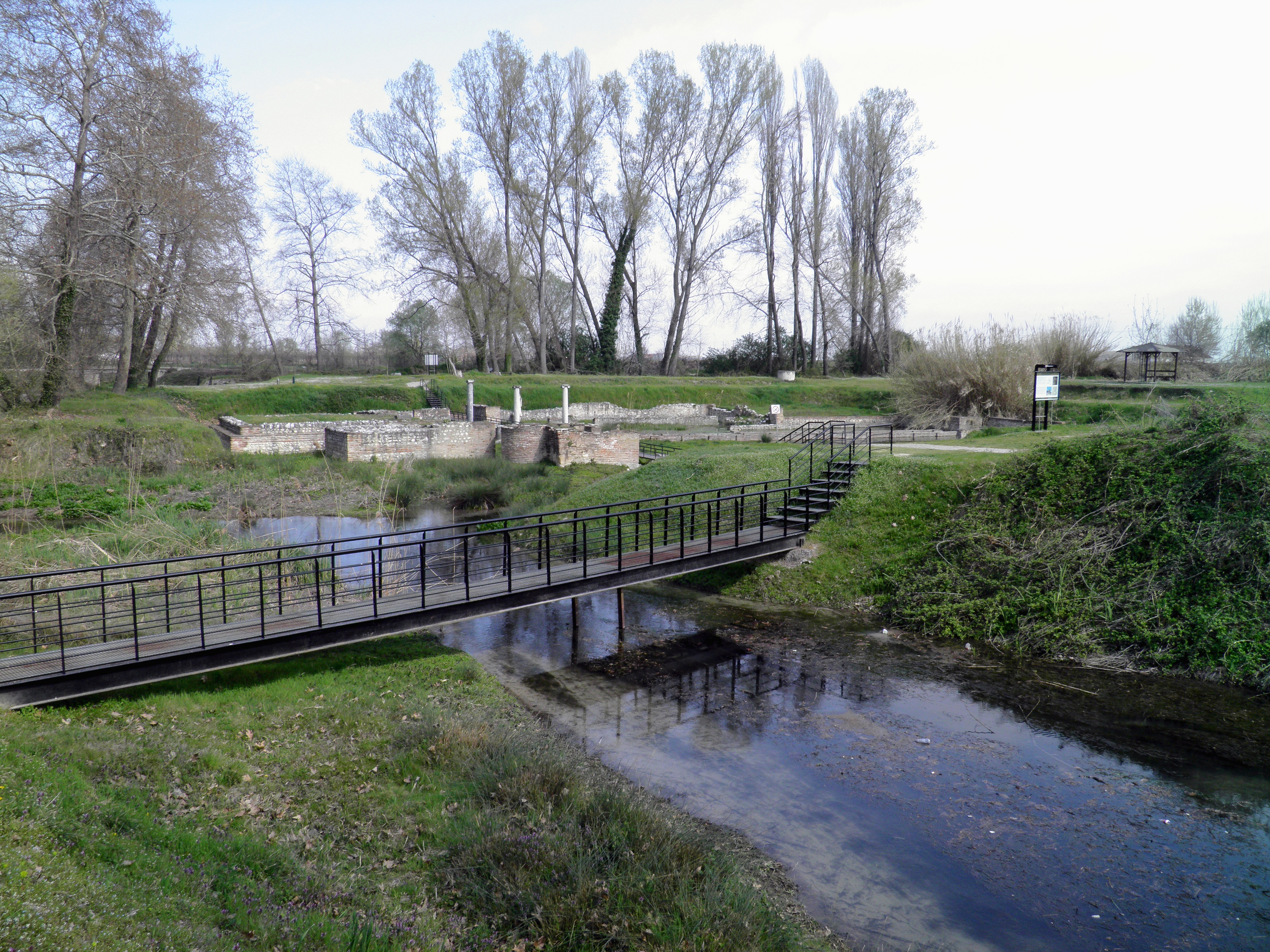
The sacred spring with the sanctuary of Zeus Hypsistos in the background

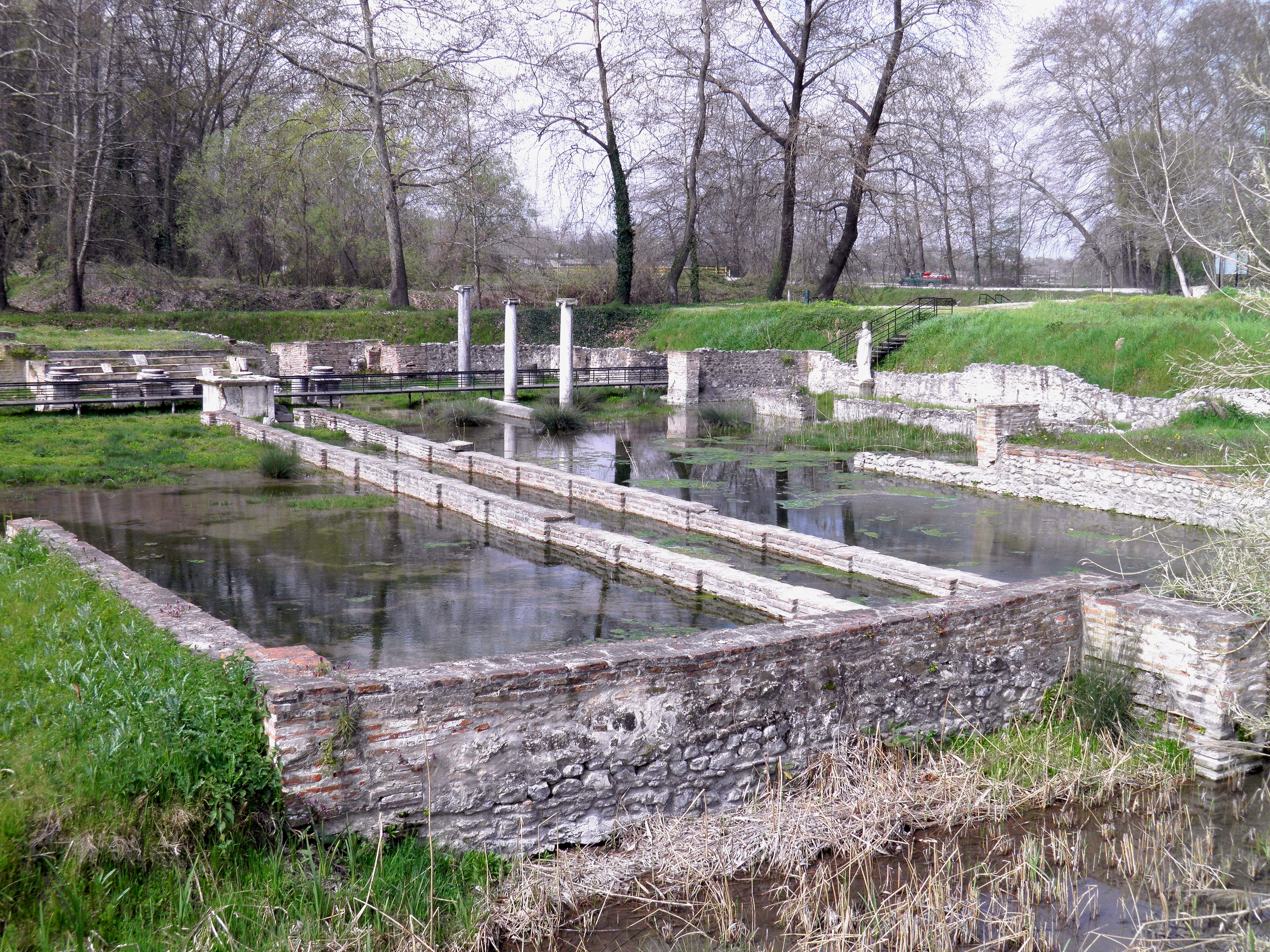
Sanctuary of Isis

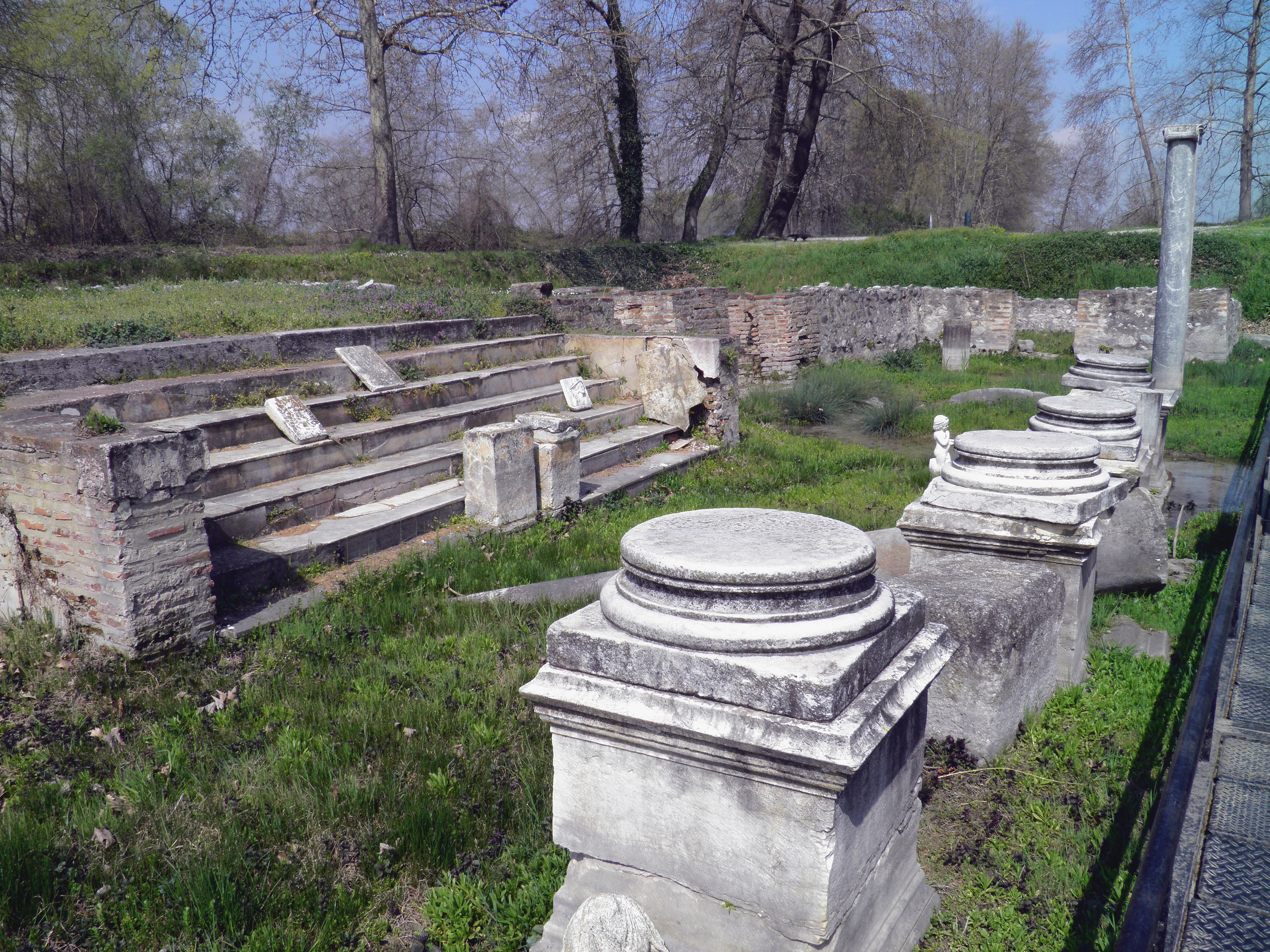
Four-columned temple dedicated to Isis Lochia, Sanctuary of Isis

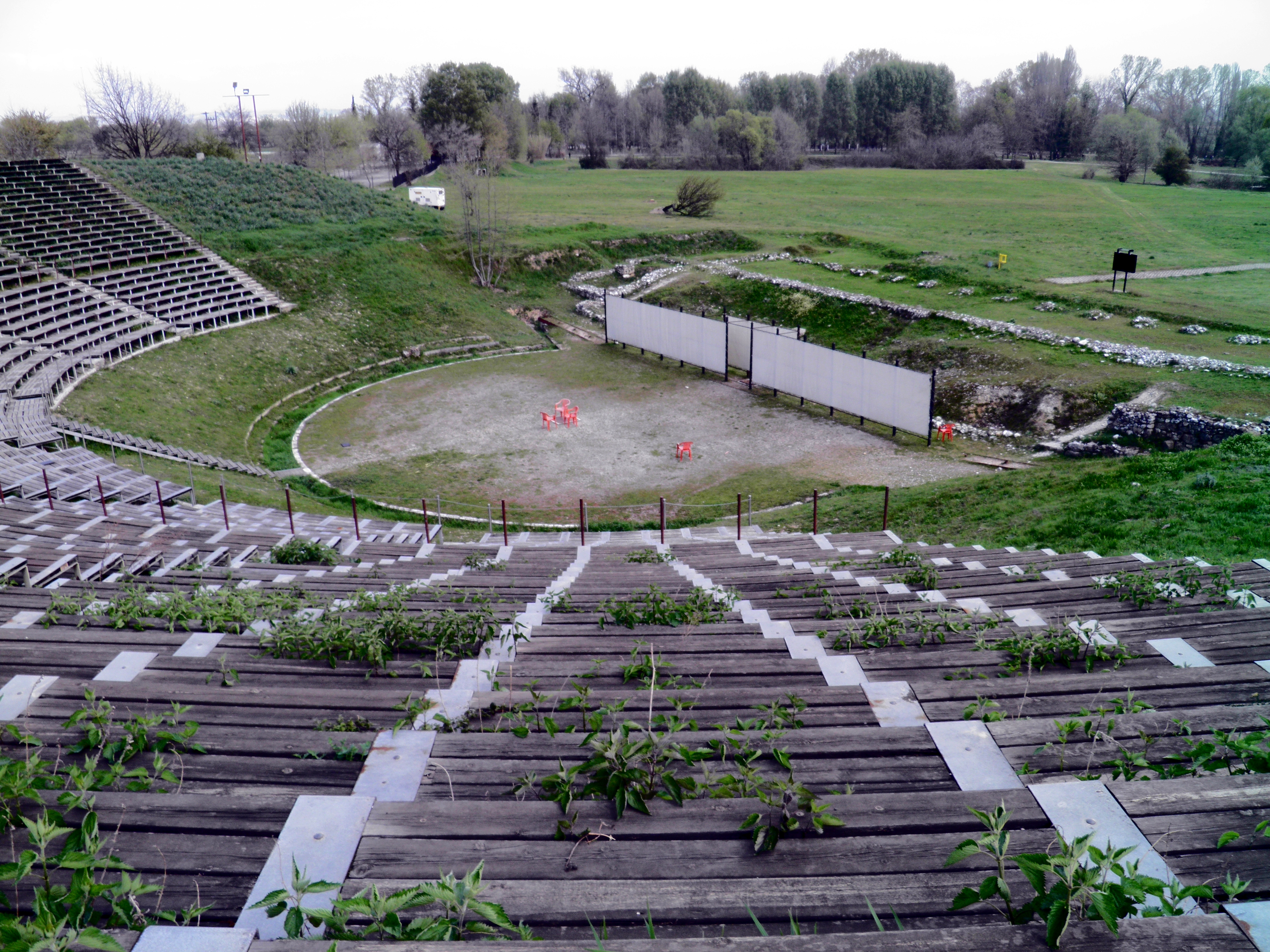
View of the Hellenistic theater

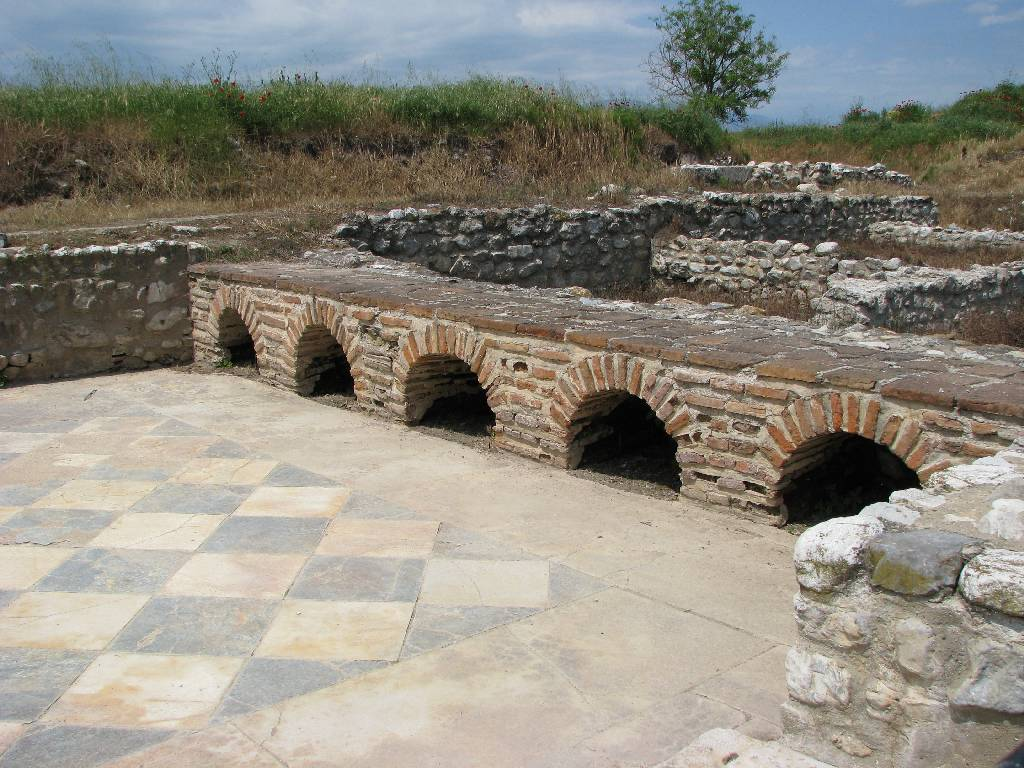
Baths of ancient Dion

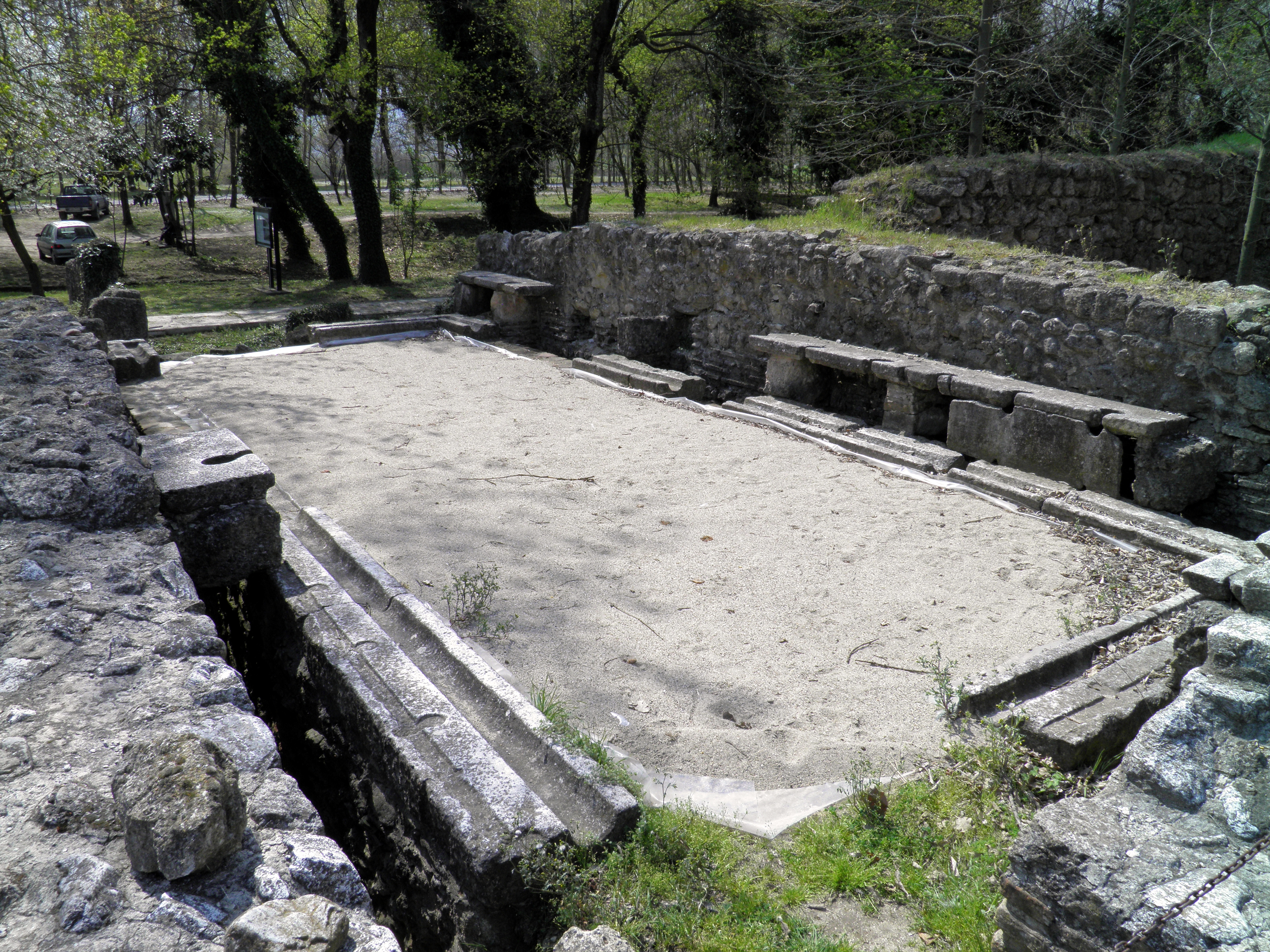
Public toilets along the central road

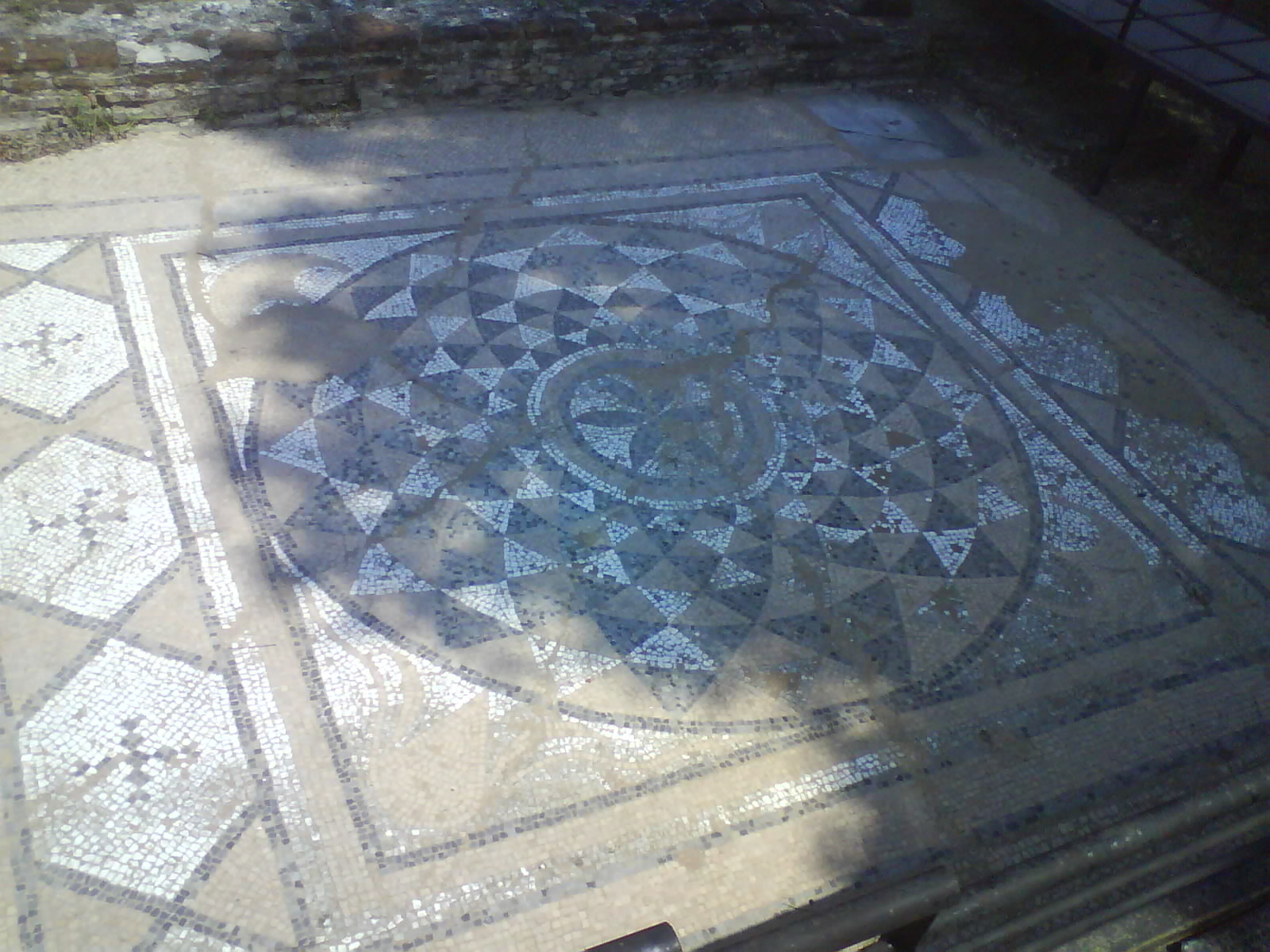
Mosaic floor in the Great Baths complex

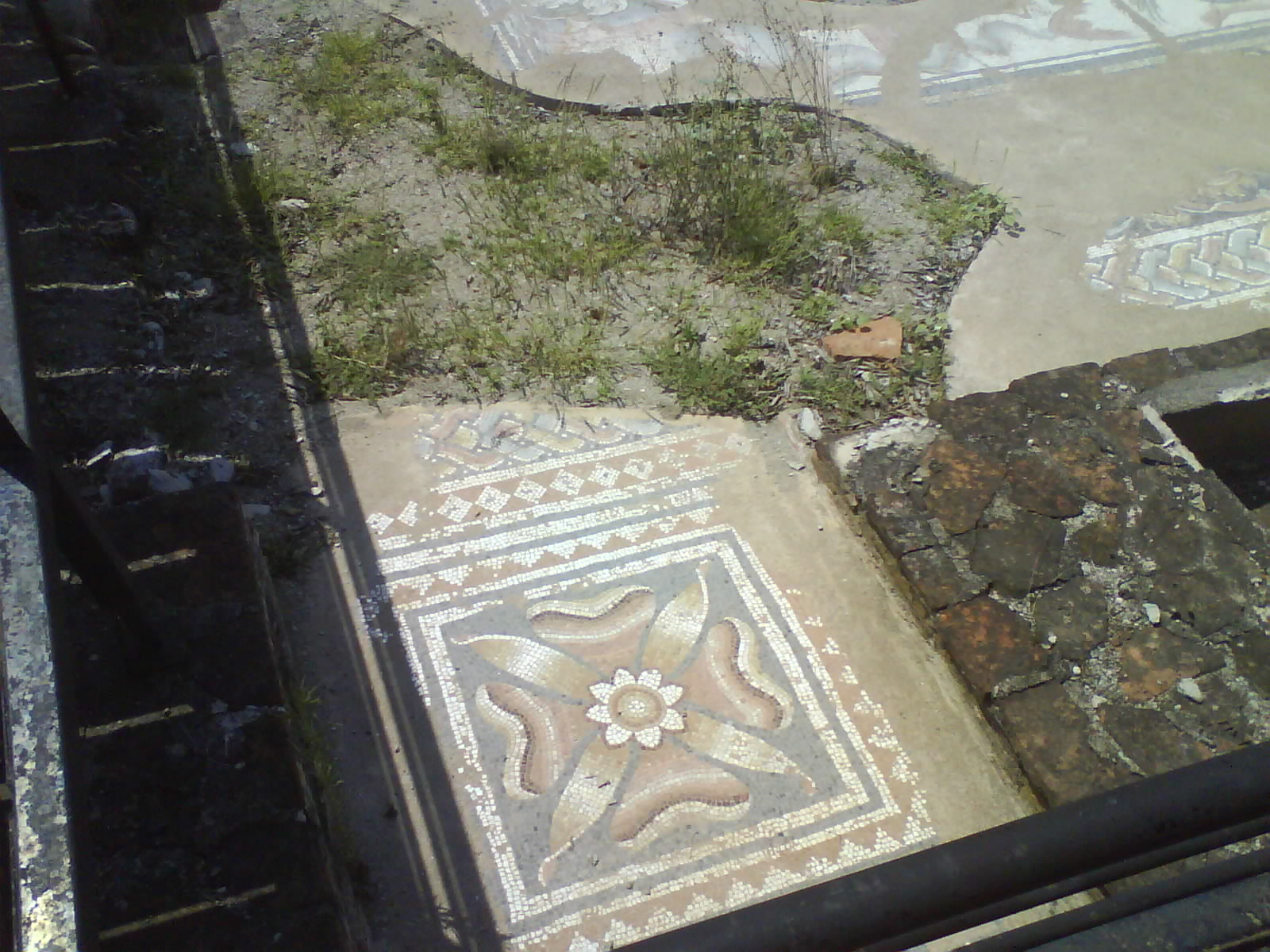
Detail of a mosaic floor, Great Baths complex

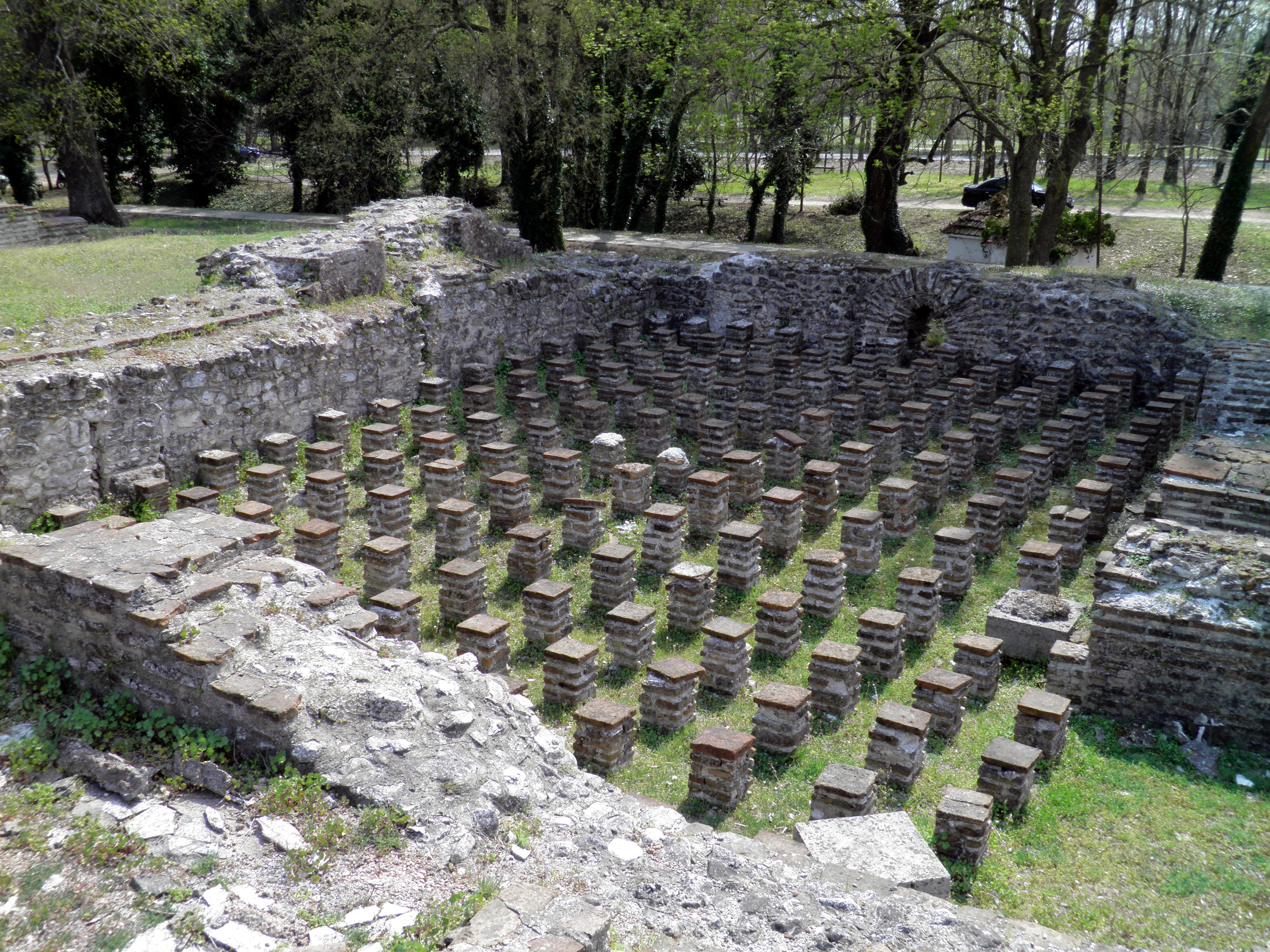
The hypocaust of the Great Baths complex

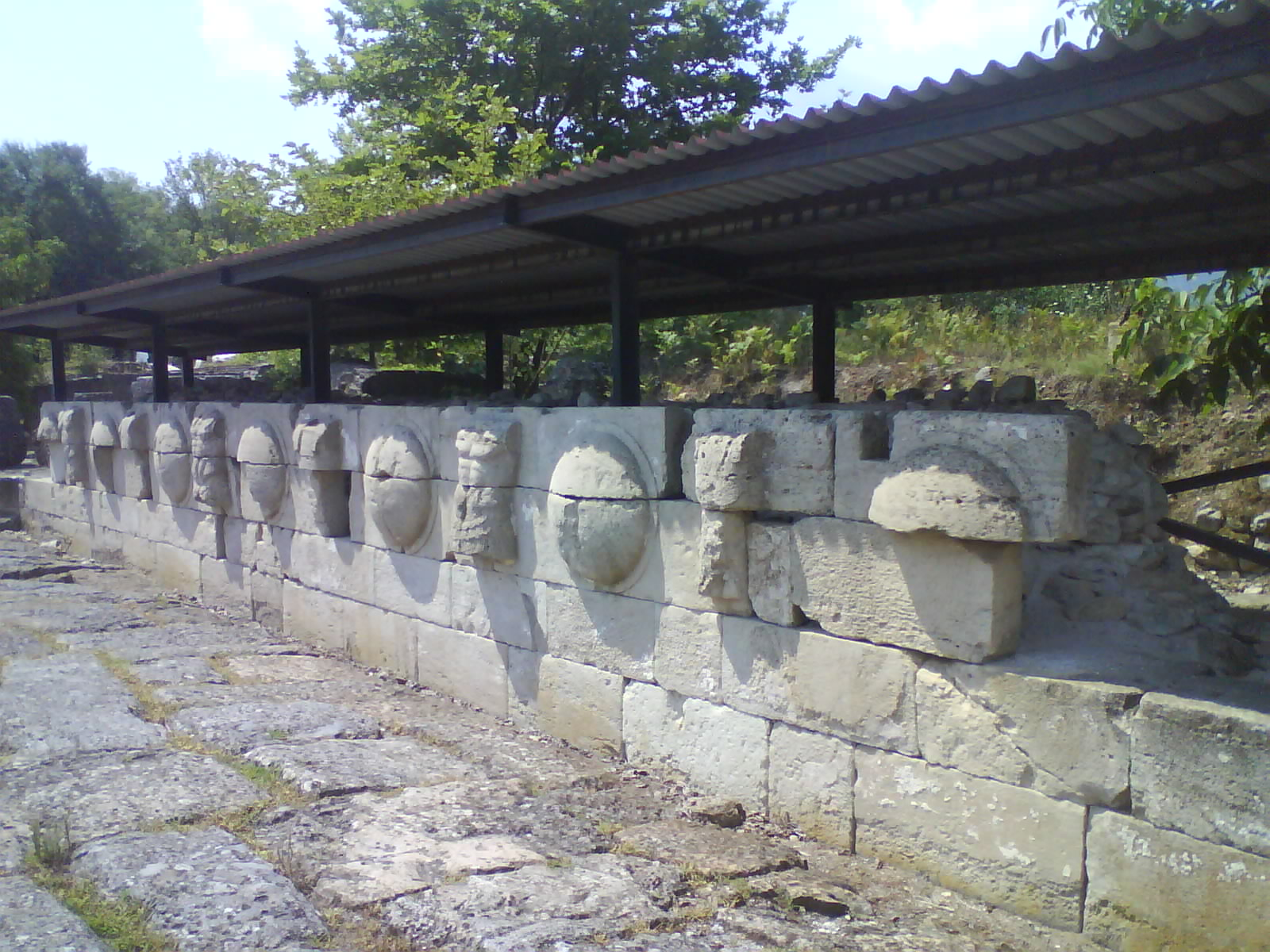
Shields dedicated by Alexander the Great on his victory over the Persians at the Granicus river

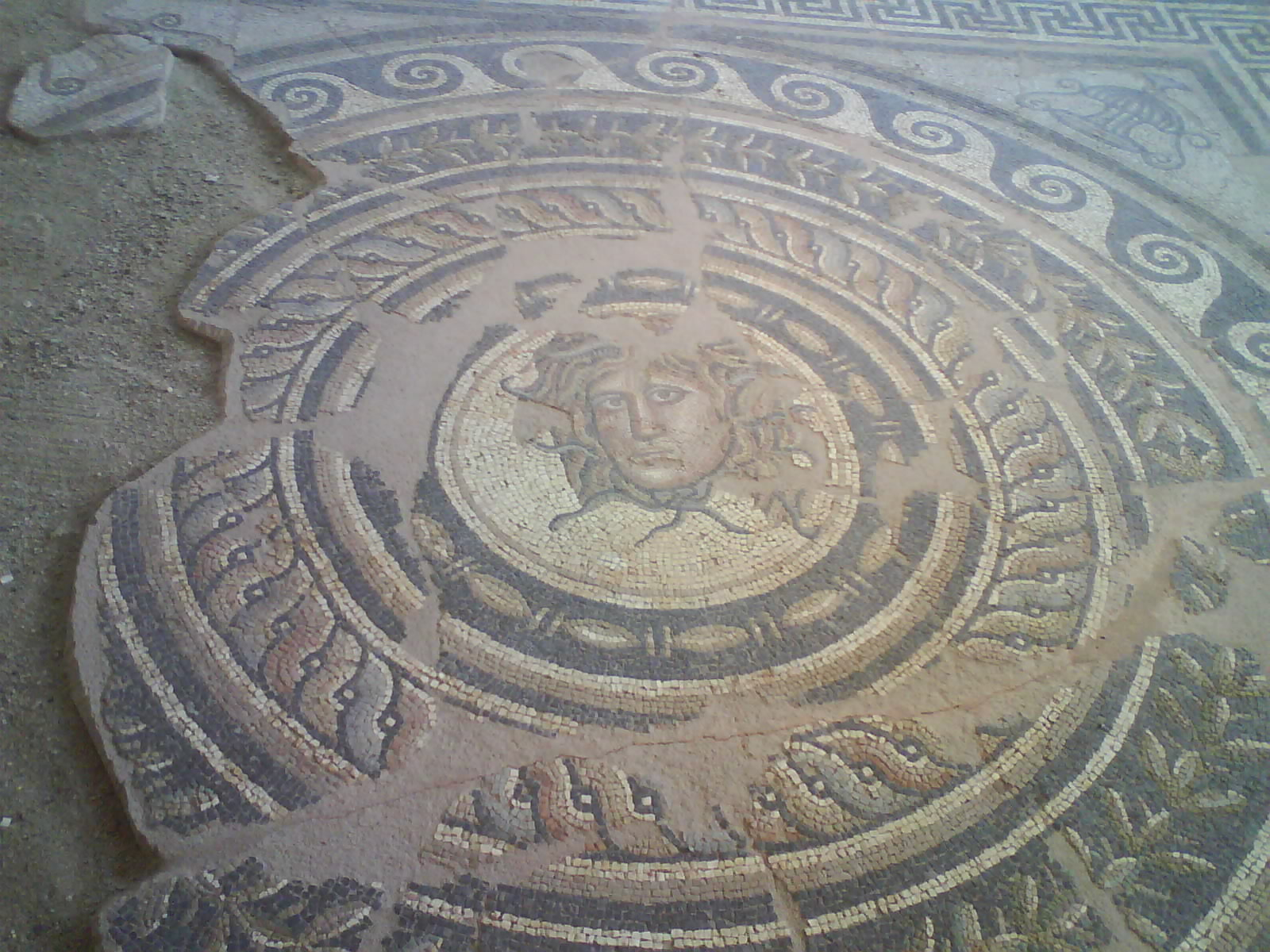
Large mosaic at the Archaeological Museum of Dion

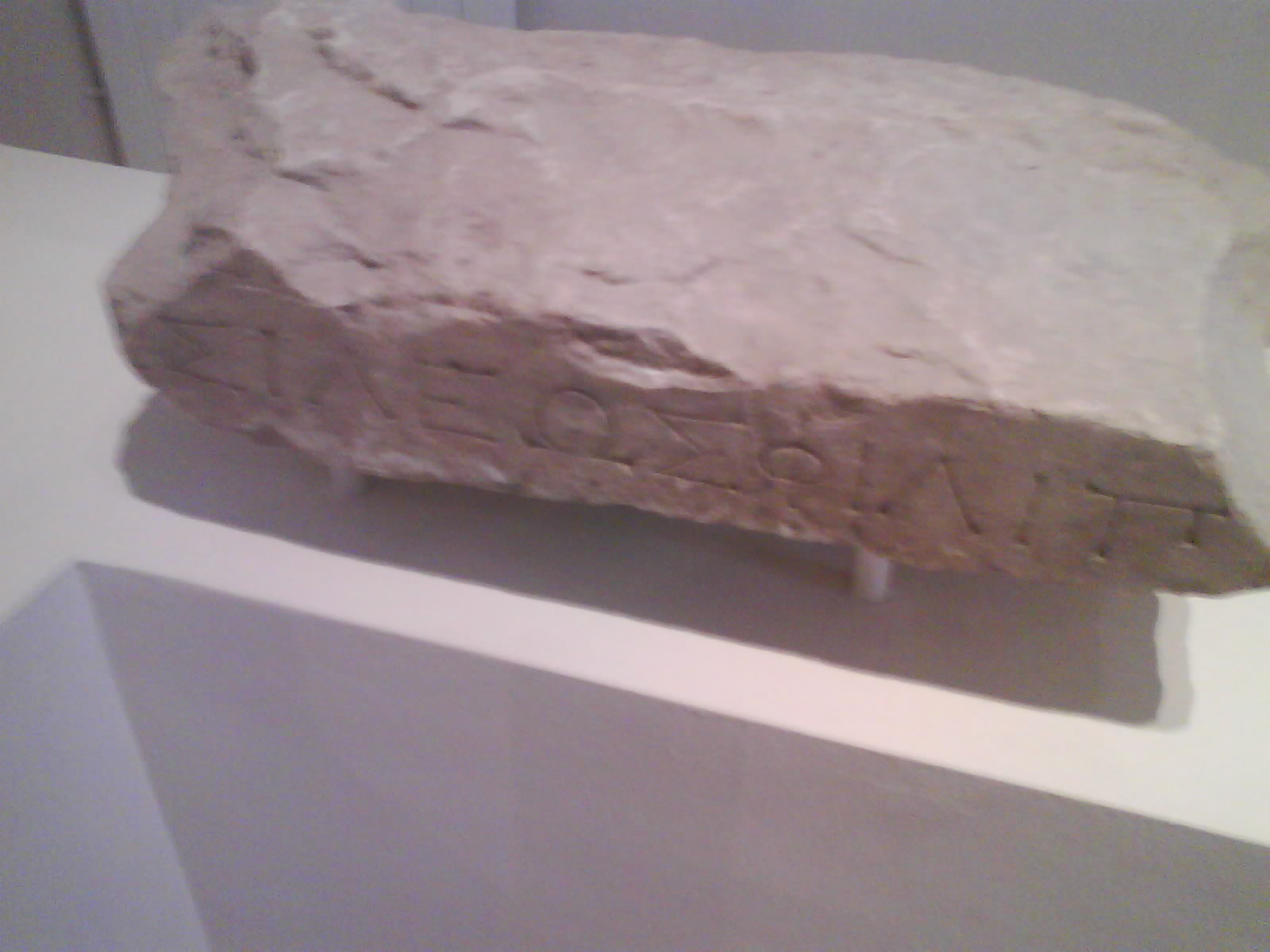
Inscription from the Archaeological Museum of Dion reading "ΒΑΣΣΙΛΕΩΣ ΦΙΛΙΠΠΟΥ" [King Philip]

== See also ==
- Archaeological Museum of Dion
- List of settlements in the Pieria regional unit
- Macedonia, Greece
- Macedon

== Notes ==
- F. Papazoglou, Les villes de Macédoine romaine, Supplément 18 du BCH, Paris, 1988.
- D. Pandermalis, Dion, the archaeological site and the museum, Athens, 1997.
