= Platanakia =

Platanakia Πλατανάκια
- Settlement
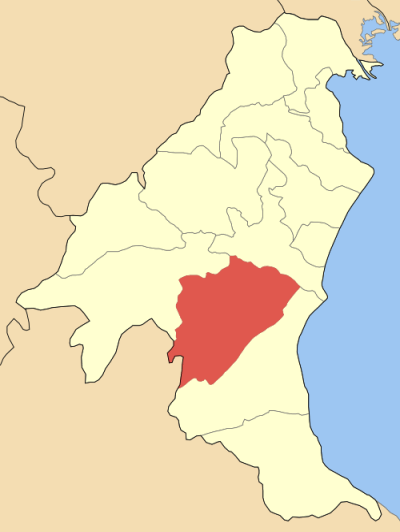
- Location within the regional unit

- Location within Greece
- Coordinates: 40°09′N 22°29′E
- Country: Greece
- Administrative region: Central Macedonia
- Regional unit: Pieria
- Municipality: Dio-Olympos
- Municipal unit: Dion
- Community: Dion
- Elevation: 40 m (130 ft)

Population (2021)
  - Total: 148
- Time zone: UTC+2 (EET)
  - Summer (DST): UTC+3 (EEST)
- Postal code: 601 00
- Area code: 23510
- Vehicle registration: KN

Platanakia (Greek: Πλατανάκια) is a settlement of the former municipality of Dion, which is part of the municipality of Dio-Olympos, in the Pieria regional unit, Central Macedonia, Greece. It was founded in 1954 by Greek refugees, coming from the region of Pontus.

The name Platanakia, comes by the agreement of the residents, because below the village, there are about 10 large trees which has been planted by a Sarakatsani farmer, years ago. The population of the village was 148 people as of 2021.

== Notes ==
- "Σαλπιγγίδης Πολύκαρπος, 50 χρόνια Πλατανάκια, εκδ. Δήμος Δίου"
