= Agios Spiridonas (Limassol) =

Quarter of Limassol Municipality

Coordinates: 34.67274221°N 33.00630658°E

Agios Spyridonas is a district of the Municipality of Limassol.

== Location ==
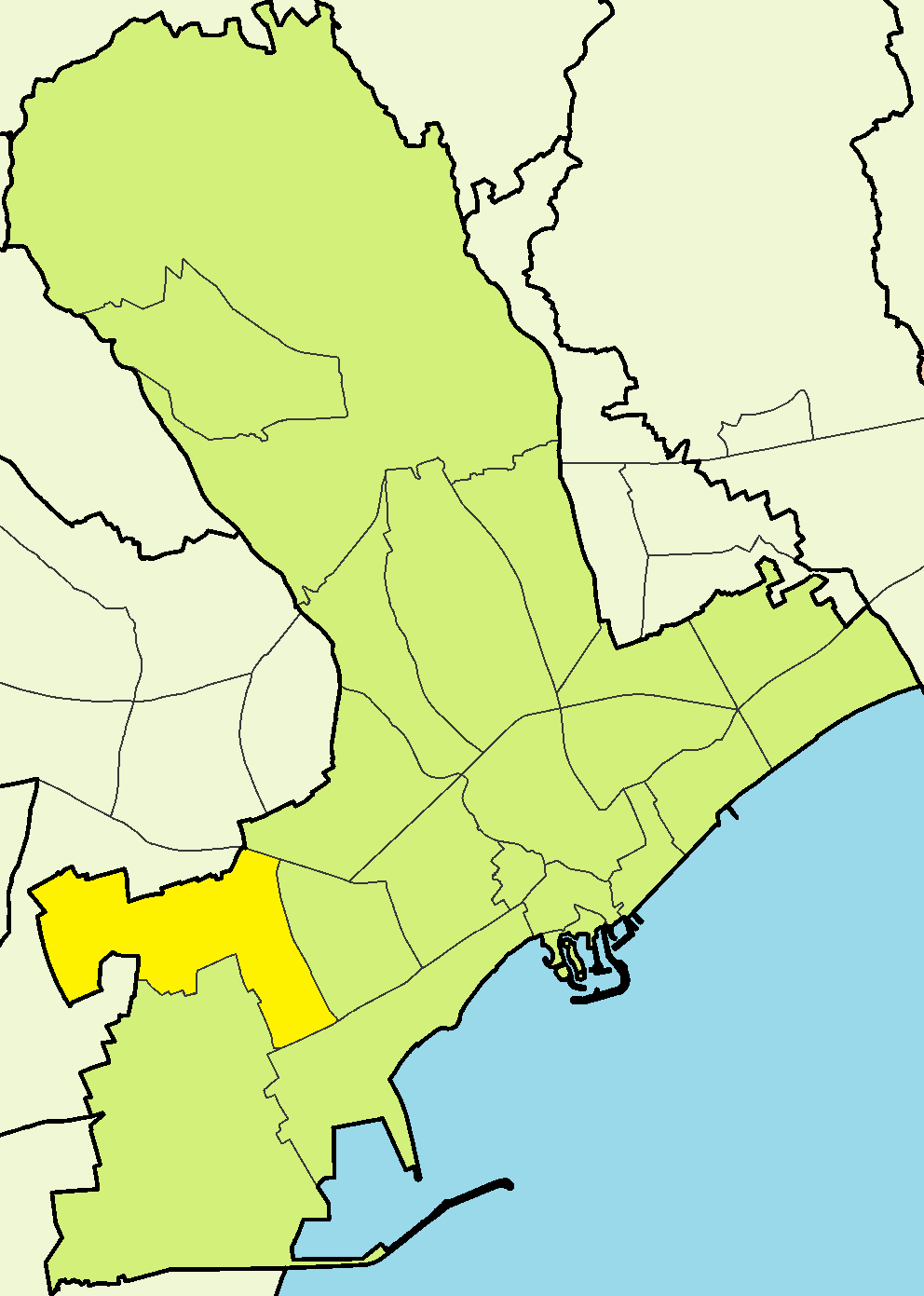
Location of quarter of Saint Spyridonas inside Limassol city.

To the south it borders with Zakaki, to the southeast with Tsiflikoudia, to the east with Omonoia, to the northeast with Apostolos Andreas and to the west and northwest with Kato Polemidia.

== History ==
Before 1960 the area of Agios Spyridon was a large plain, in which there were only a few farmhouses. In 1938–39, during the British occupation, an airport was built and operated by the British in the area. The airport was considered necessary due to World War II. Allied forces had set up camps in neighboring Palestine and Egypt, which needed protection from the German navy and air force. Cyprus itself needed protection.

The airport channel started from the area of Omonoia and continued to the area of Agios Spyridon. The land, which was seized by the British, belonged to Greek Cypriot landowners. After the end of the war, the airport continued to operate for several years. In 1947-48 it was abandoned and the land was returned to its owners.

In the 1960s, the land development of the area began, which resulted in the creation of the district of Agios Spyridon and the district of Omonoia. However, the bus was not damaged and was used for a few years as a place for practicing apprentice drivers. Due to the existence of the airport, the area of Agios Spyridon and Omonoia had acquired the toponym airport.

On December 12, 1980, the new church of Agios Spyridon was opened in the area, on the site of an older one that already existed in the same area. After the Turkish invasion of 1974, a refugee settlement was built in the area, in which Greek Cypriot refugees settled, a fact that increased the population of the area.

== Area map ==
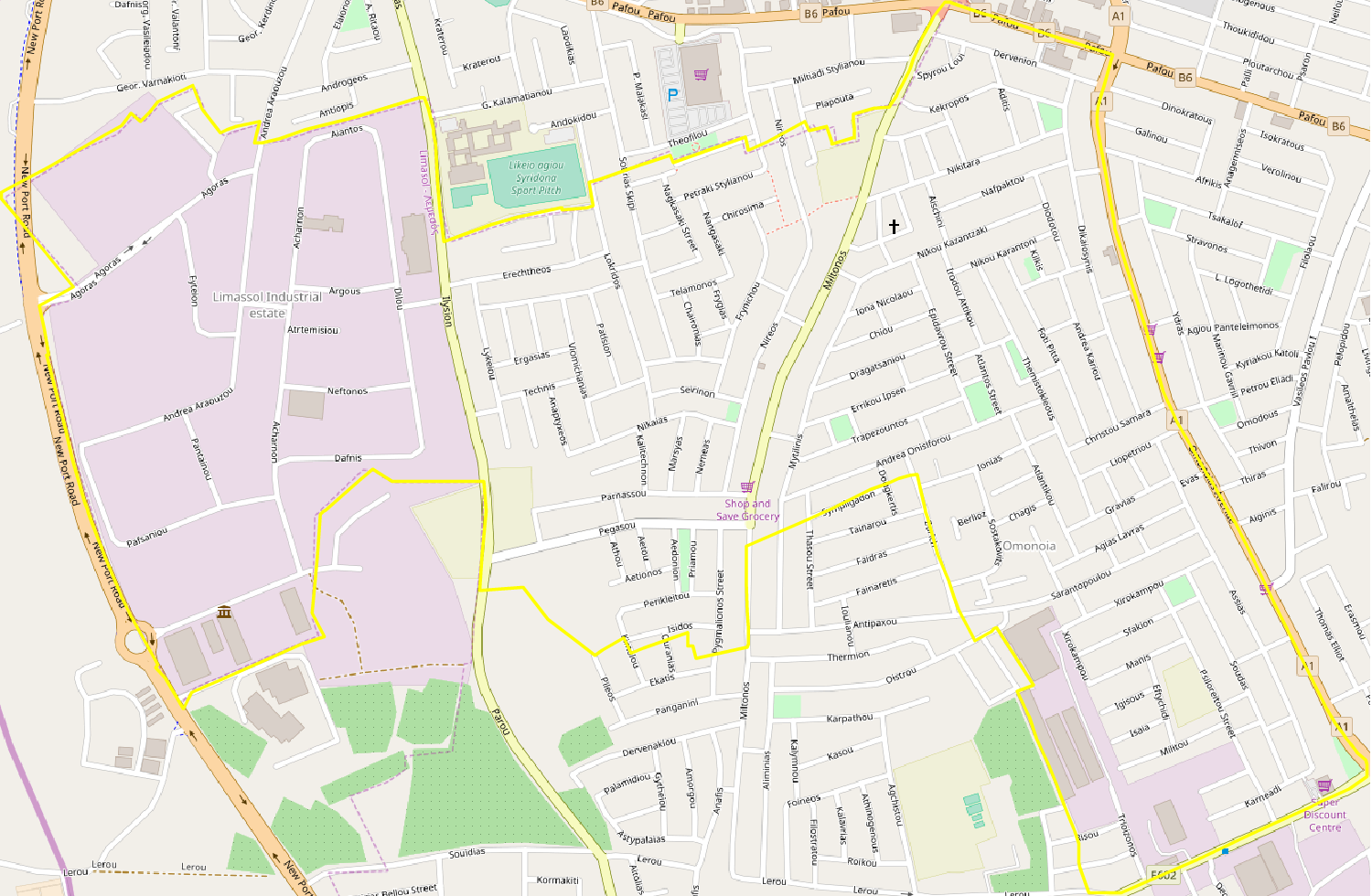
Agios (Greek for Saint) Spyridonas area of Limassol city Cyprus.
