= Agios Spyridonas, Pieria =

Agios Spyridonas Άγιος Σπυρίδωνας
- Community
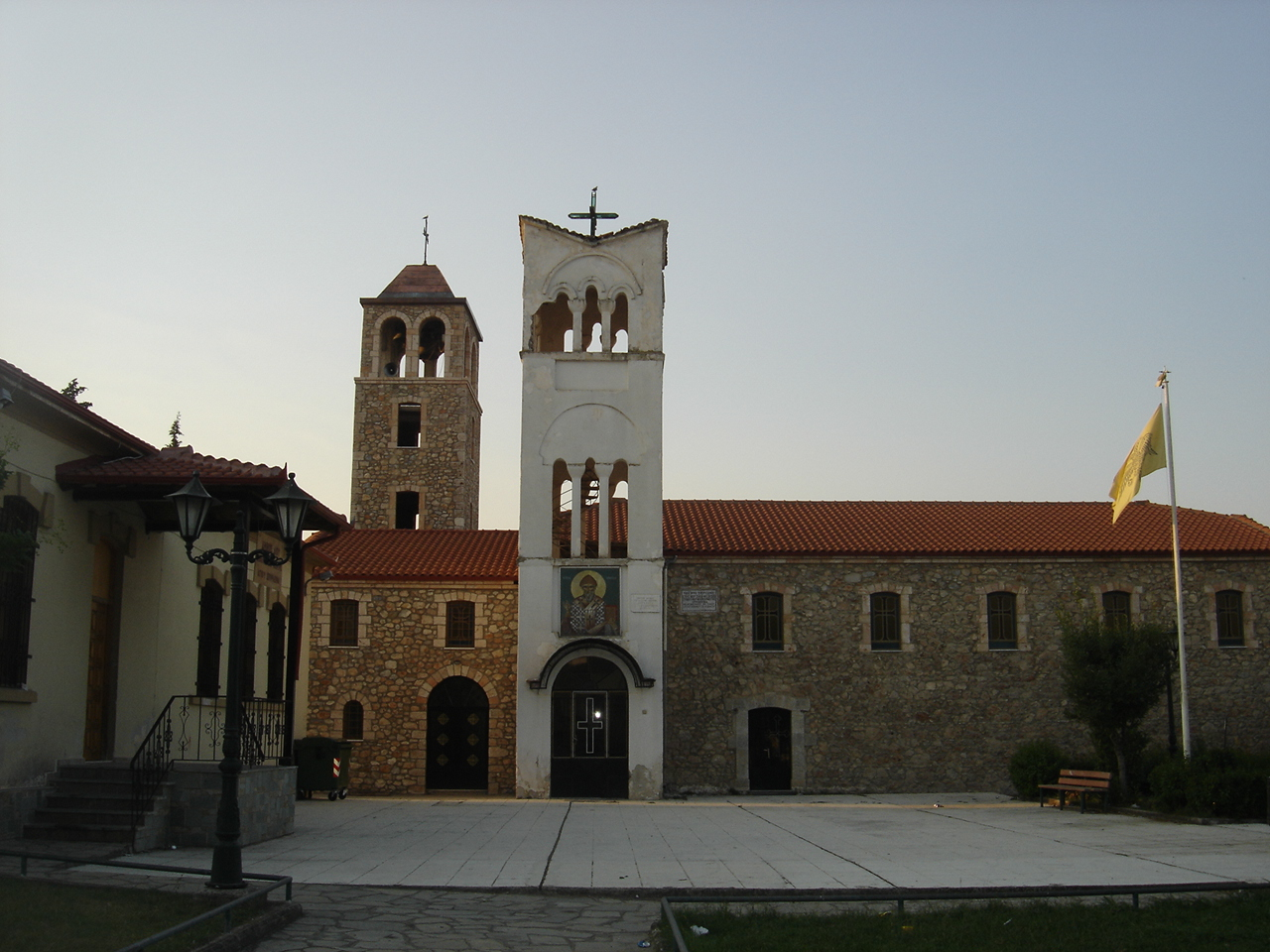
- The church of Agios Spyridonas.

- Location within Greece
- Coordinates: 40°12′N 22°26′E
- Country: Greece
- Administrative region: Central Macedonia
- Regional unit: Pieria
- Municipality: Dio-Olympos
- Municipal unit: Dion

Area
  - Community: 13.52 km^{2} (5.22 sq mi)
- Elevation: 70 m (230 ft)

Population (2021)
  - Community: 1,377
  - Density: 101.8/km^{2} (263.8/sq mi)
- Time zone: UTC+2 (EET)
  - Summer (DST): UTC+3 (EEST)
- Postal code: 601 00
- Area code: 23510
- Vehicle registration: KN

Agios Spyridonas (Greek: Άγιος Σπυρίδωνας) is a village and a community of the Dio-Olympos municipality. Before the 2011 local government reform it was part of the municipality of Dion, of which it was a municipal district. The 2021 census recorded 1,377 inhabitants in the village. The community of Agios Spyridonas covers an area of 13.52 km^{2}.

== History ==
Agios Spyridonas was founded in the end of the 19th century by Aromanians (Vlachs) from Samarina. They are all Orthodox Christians. In the 20th Sarakatsani settled in the village and, shortly afterwards, in 1955 the village was recognised as an independent community. The church of the village, dedicated to Saint Spyridon, was built in 1915.

== Economy ==
The main occupations of Agios Spyridonas' residents are agriculture (mainly tobacco) and animal husbandry.

== See also ==
- List of settlements in the Pieria regional unit
