= Omonoia, Limassol =

Quarter of Limassol Municipality

Coordinates: 34°40′10″N 33°01′06″E

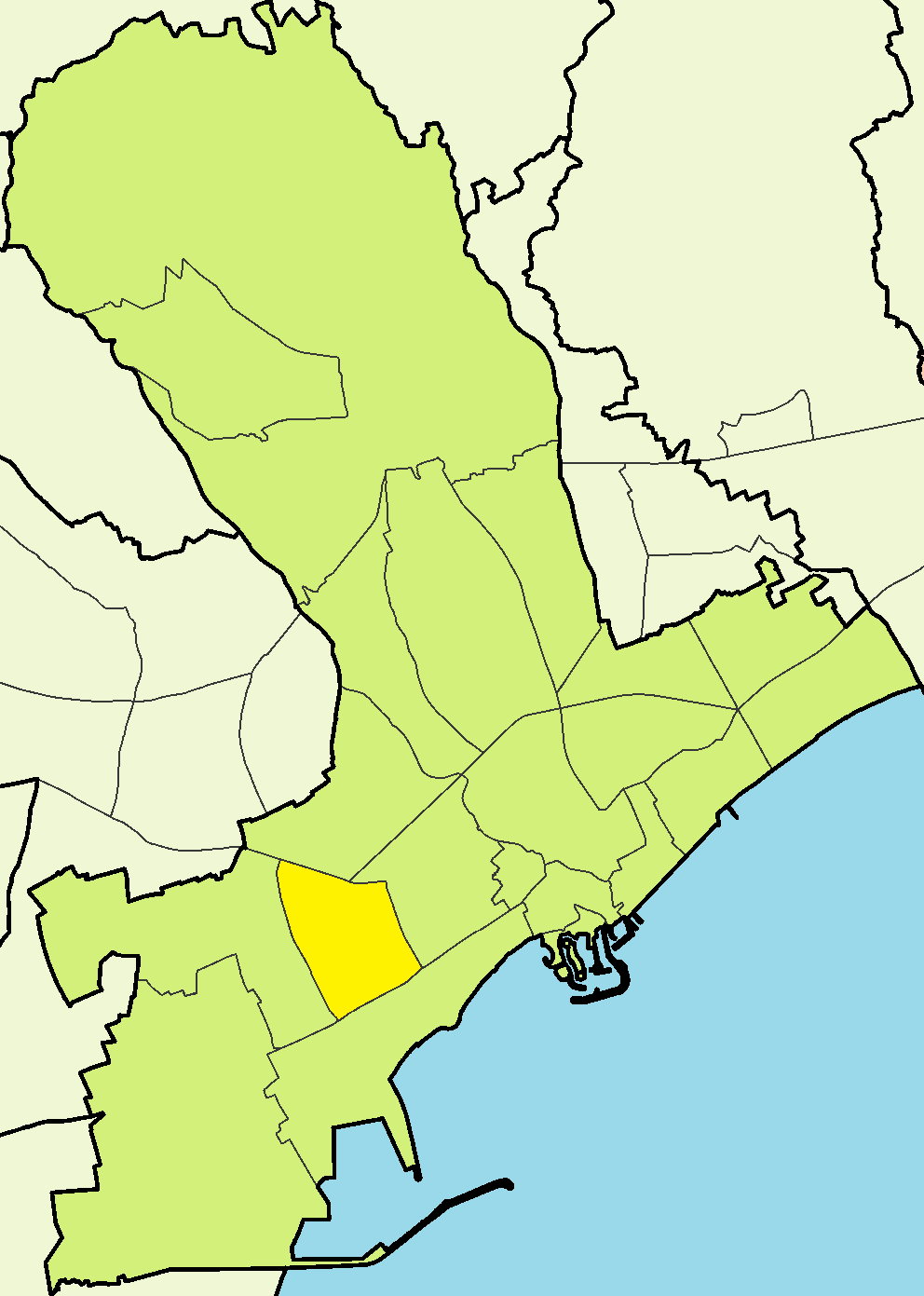
Map showing in yellow colour the location of Omonoia district inside Limassol Municipality.

Omonoia (Greek: Ομόνοια pronounced [oˈmo.ni.a]), is a quarter in the municipality of Limassol in the Limassol District of Cyprus. It is situated near the Port of Limassol. The quarter takes its name from the Omonoias Avenue. It borders Saint Spyridonas to the west and Agios Ioannis to the east. Many central avenues go by around Omonoia, namely Pafou Avenue, Omonoias Avenue, Franklin Roosevelt Avenue and Makarios Avenue, making it a high traffic area.

The Port of Limassol, one of the largest commercial ports in the Mediterranean Sea, is situated in Omonoia. Therefore it is generally known in Cyprus as the home of intense commercial shipping activity. The offices of dozens of shipping companies are along Omonoias Avenue. A few shipping companies choose to make their offices on Franklin Roosevelt Avenue in Omonoia.

== History ==
Before 1960 the area of Omonoia was a large plain, in which there were only a few farmhouses. In 1938-39, during the British occupation, an airport was built and operated by the British in the area. The airport was considered necessary due to World War II. Allied forces had set up camps in neighbouring Palestine and Egypt, which needed protection from the German navy and air force. Cyprus itself needed protection.

The airport channel started from the area of Omonoia and continued to the area of Agios Spyridon. The land, which was seized by the British, belonged to Greek Cypriot landowners. After the end of the war, the airport continued to operate for several years. In 1947-48 it was abandoned and the land was returned to its owners.

In the 1960s the landscaping of the area began, resulting in the creation of the districts of Omonoia and Agios Spyridon. However, the bus was not damaged and was used for a few years as a place for practising apprentice drivers.

Due to the existence of the airport, the area of Omonoia and Agios Spyridon had acquired the toponym airport.

== Development ==
The project ''Creation of a Centre for Innovation and Entrepreneurship at the Municipality’s premises on Franklin Roosevelt Street'' is being built partially inside Omonoia area.

== Notable Architecture ==
1. Zavos Pavilion Center (completed in 2014) is a green energy building that makes use of new technologies.
2. The 13-storey PIERIS building is referred by the media as one of the 'ghost buildings' of Limassol. It was semi-completed more than 40 earlier and left in this ghostly state ever since. One local newspaper reports the allegation that the person who started the project presold the office spaces and then left the building unfinished while he himself left the Cyprus Republic for ever. The same local newspaper claims that the Pieris building is a modernist high building built before the Turkish Invasion in 1974 along other similar buildings in Limassol with the aim of antagonizing the already developed modernist architecture of Ammochostos city.

== Area Map ==
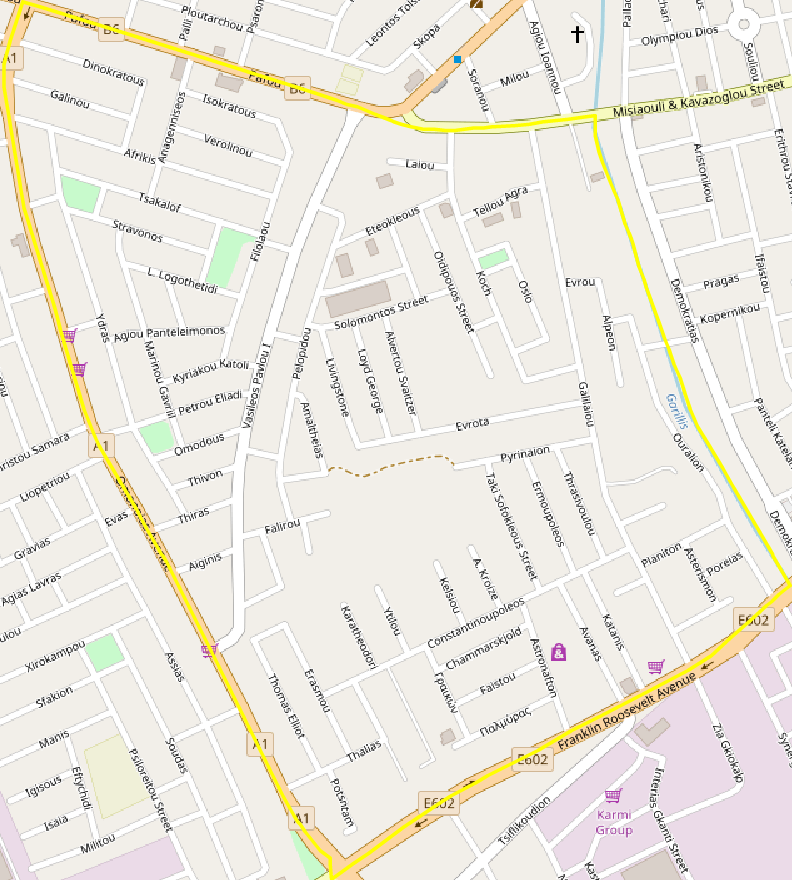
Local Map of Omonoia area of Limassol city in Cyprus.
