= Rachi =

Rachi may refer to:

- Rachi, Achaea, Greece
- Rachi, Pieria, Greece
- Rachi, Russia
- Rachi Synagogue, in Troyes, Grand Est, France

== See also ==
- Rachis (disambiguation)
