= Ziaziakos =

Ziaziakos Ζιάζιακος
- Settlement
- Location within Greece
- Coordinates: 40°12′48.40″N 22°16′09.60″E
- Country: Greece
- Administrative region: Central Macedonia
- Regional unit: Pieria
- Elevation: 570 m (1,870 ft)
- Time zone: UTC+2 (EET)
  - Summer (DST): UTC+3 (EEST)

Ziaziakos (Greek: Ζιάζιακος) was a village in the Pierian Mountains of the regional unit of Pieria. The establishment of the village was likely in the middle of the 18th century and it is said to have consisted of at least 18 families. The livestock industry was the main occupation of the inhabitants. Its inhabitants because of the Ottoman domination were forced to resort to safer areas and thus abandoned it around the middle of the 19th century (1850–1860), and settled in the present villages of Lofos and Rachi (which were a single village which the inhabitants originally called it also Ziaziakos). The altitude of the location where the village was built is 570 meters and the village is 15 km away from Lofos and 28 km from Katerini. In this former village is the church of Koimisis tis Theotokou, which still stands there till this day as the only building of the village.
