= Kato Milia =

Kato Milia Κάτω Μηλιά
- Settlement
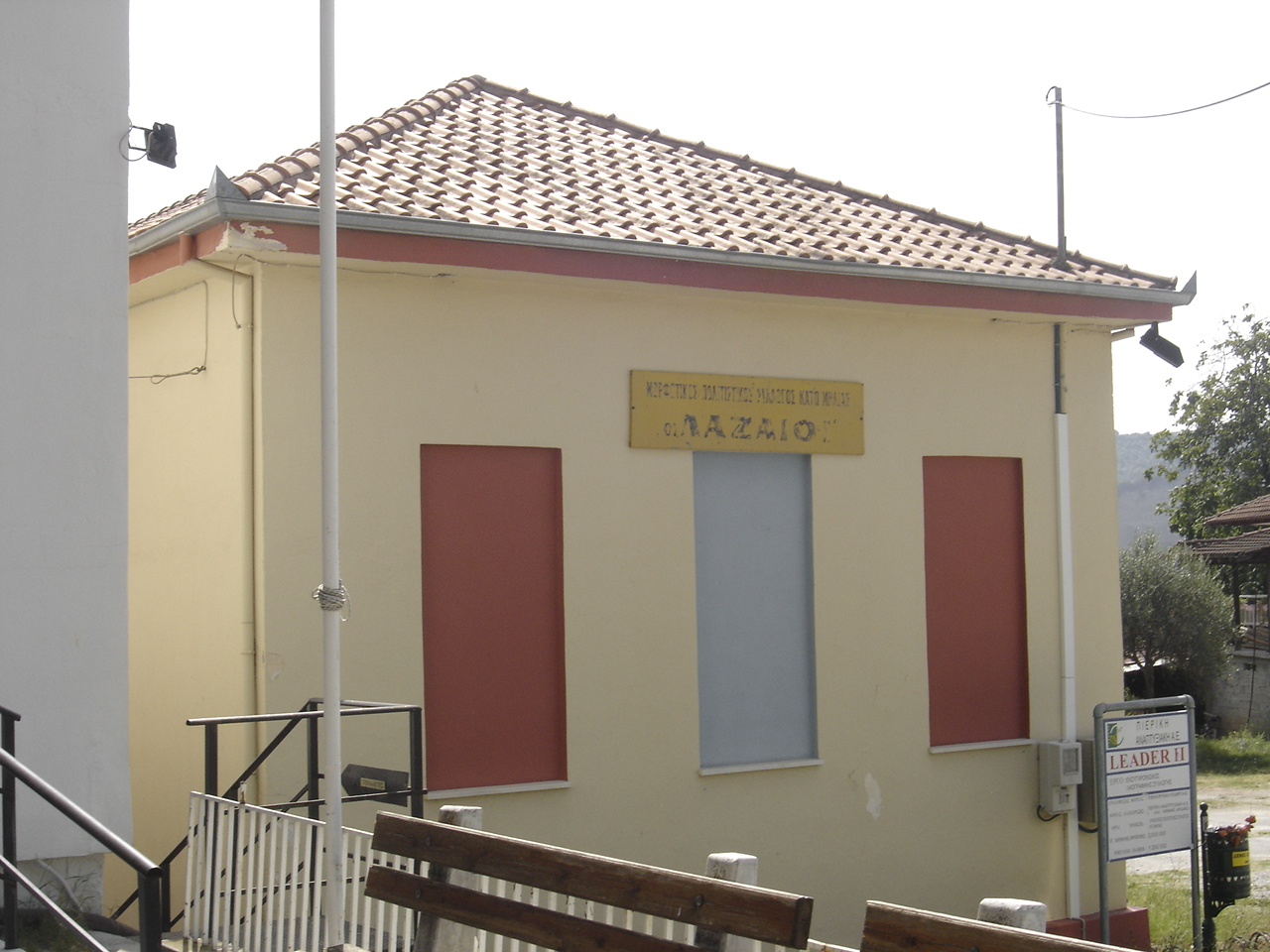
- The cultural association of Kato Milia.

- Location within Greece
- Coordinates: 40°15.3′N 22°20.5′E
- Country: Greece
- Administrative region: Central Macedonia
- Regional unit: Pieria
- Municipality: Katerini
- Municipal unit: Petra
- Community: Milia
- Elevation: 180 m (590 ft)

Population (2021)
  - Total: 776
- Time zone: UTC+2 (EET)
  - Summer (DST): UTC+3 (EEST)
- Postal code: 601 00
- Area code: +30-2351
- Vehicle registration: KN

Kato Milia (Greek: Κάτω Μηλιά) is a village of the Katerini municipality. Before the 2011 local government reform it was part of the municipality of Petra. The 2021 census recorded 776 inhabitants in the village. Kato Milia is a part of the community of Milia.

== See also ==
- List of settlements in the Pieria regional unit
