= Fteri, Pieria =

Fteri Φτέρη
- Settlement
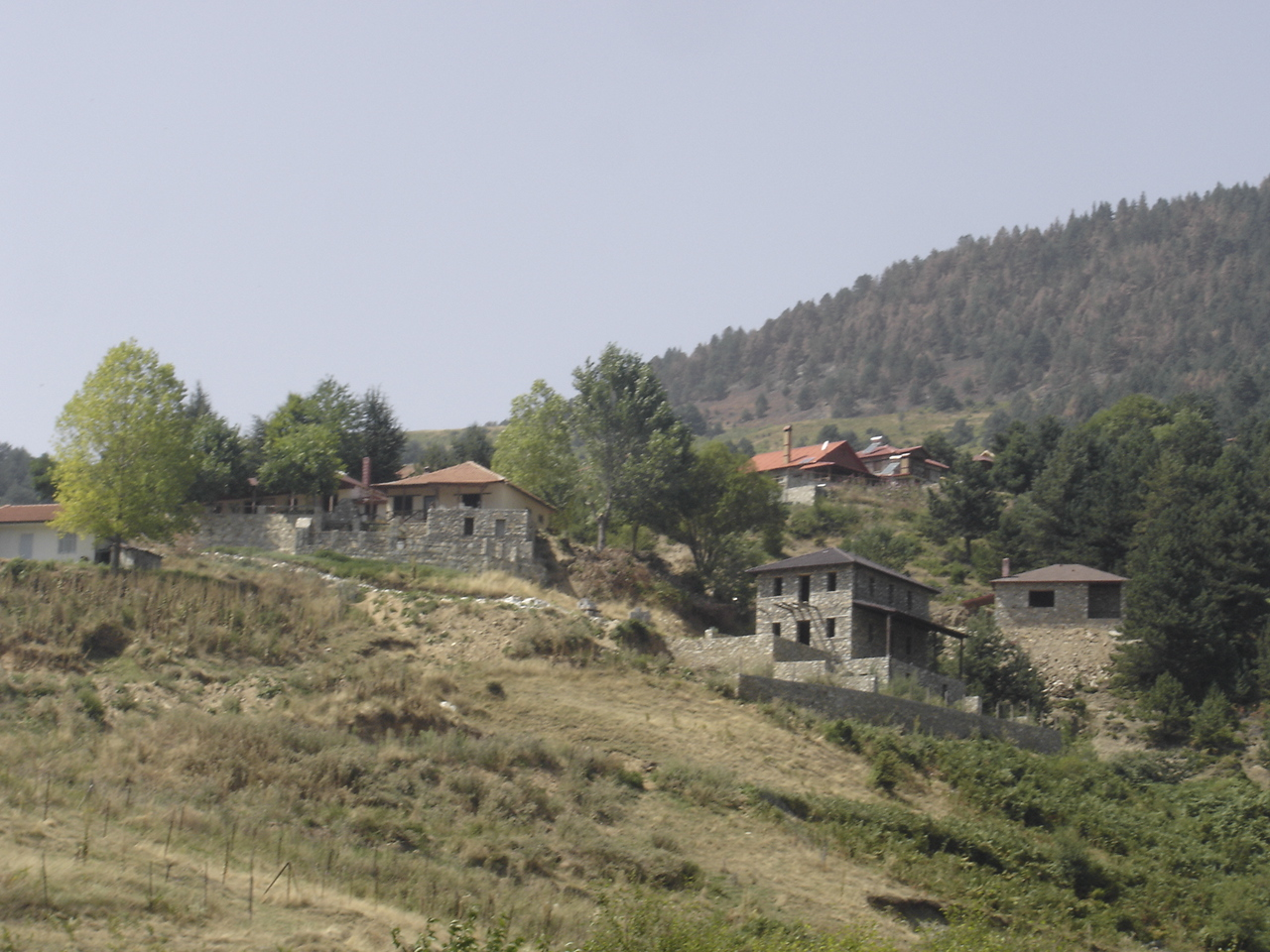
- View of Fteri

- Location within Greece
- Coordinates: 40°11.7′N 22°8.958′E
- Country: Greece
- Administrative region: Central Macedonia
- Regional unit: Pieria
- Municipality: Katerini
- Municipal unit: Petra
- Community: Milia
- Elevation: 1,240 m (4,070 ft)

Population (2021)
  - Total: 6
- Time zone: UTC+2 (EET)
  - Summer (DST): UTC+3 (EEST)
- Postal code: 601 00
- Area code: +30-2351
- Vehicle registration: KN

Fteri (Greek: Φτέρη, Aromanian: Fearica) is an Aromanian (Vlach) village of the Katerini municipality. Before the 2011 local government reform it was part of the municipality of Petra. The 2021 census recorded 6 inhabitants in the village. Fteri is a part of the community of Milia.

The name of the village, Fteri, means fern in Greek.

== History ==
Fteri was the first residence of the Vlach inhabitants of Karitsa of Pieria, who had come from Epirus. The village played an important role during the Greek Liberation Revolution of 1821, as many families of Armatoles from Olympus originated from there. Among them are the father of Giorgakis Olympios, the family of the chief Vlachomichalis and the ancestors of the Lazians. According to the historian Vakalopoulos, Georgakis Olympios was born in Fteri. During the years of occupation it was the hideout of Australian, New Zealander and British soldiers who fought alongside the locals against the Nazis. On December 4, 1943 the village was set on fire by the Germans who burned 146 houses and the 3 churches of Panagia, Agios Athanasios and Agia Paraskevi, as well as the cemetery. For the offer of the Kartsiotes-Fteriotes, the Government of New Zealand and the Queen of England awarded medals of bravery to the community of Karitsa and to many residents.

Although the name Fteri had prevailed for a long time, the Vlachs of the Olympus region once used the name Fearica, which is the Vlach name of the plant "fern". In some records of the 19th century, it is also referred to as Vlachofteri.

The residential beginning of Fteri is related to the arrival and settlement of refugees from Milia of Metsovo (Amerou). Once a market town in the area until 1890, Fteri had 214 inhabitants in 1928, only 12 inhabitants in 1991 and 50 inhabitants in 2001. In 2011 it had a population of 16 inhabitants, who are mainly cattle breeders and live there during the period of May–October. Today more than 150 houses have been built. The former parochial church of Panagia survives to this day.

Administratively, the settlement was abolished in 1951 and was officially re-established in 1991, when it was again attached to the community of Milia.

== See also ==
- List of settlements in the Pieria regional unit
