= Volustana =

Volustana (Βολούστανα) or Volustana pass was the main gate between ancient Macedonia and Thessaly. It is not far from Petra (Pieria).

== See also ==
- Stena Sarantaporou
