= Karyes =

Karyes Καρυές
- Municipal unit
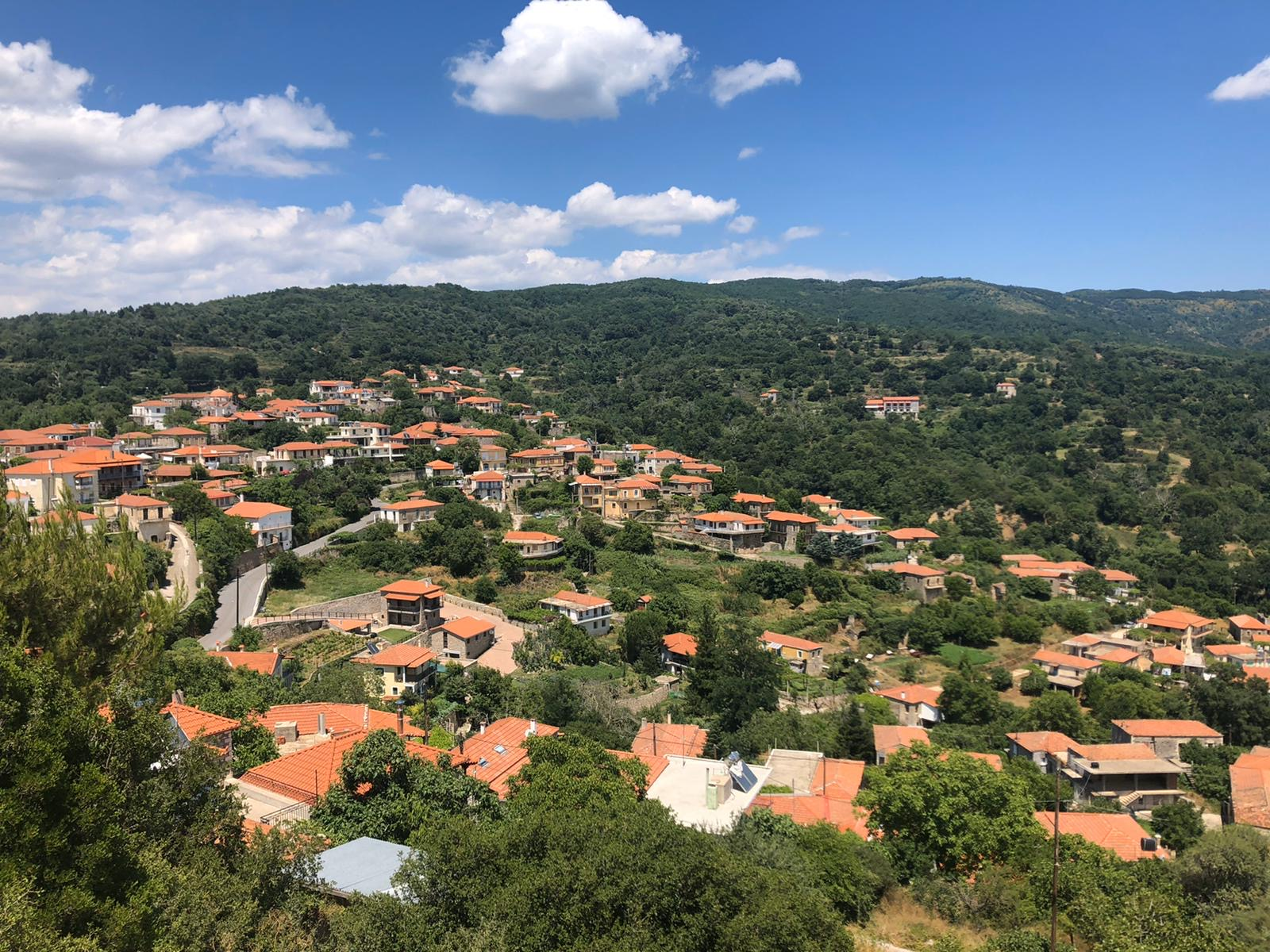
- View of Karyes.

- Location within the regional unit

- Location within Greece
- Coordinates: 37°17′N 22°30′E
- Country: Greece
- Administrative region: Peloponnese
- Regional unit: Laconia
- Municipality: Sparti

Area
  - Municipal unit: 64.43 km^{2} (24.88 sq mi)

Population (2021)
  - Municipal unit: 352
  - Municipal unit density: 5.46/km^{2} (14.1/sq mi)
- Time zone: UTC+2 (EET)
  - Summer (DST): UTC+3 (EEST)
- Vehicle registration: AK

Karyes (Greek: Καρυές, before 1930: Αράχωβα - Arachova) is a village of the Peloponnese peninsula, which is located in the southern part of Greece. The Peloponnese is made up of a number of states and Karyes belongs to the state of Laconia in which Sparta is the capital. Karyes gets its official name from the word ‘walnut’ due to the village having many walnut trees and has been spelled a number of ways such as Karyes, Karyai, Karya, Caryes, Caryai and Caryae. It should not be confused with some other villages in Greece which go by the same name such as Caria of Asia Minor, Karyes, Mount Athos, Karyes, Pieria, Karya of Argos, and Karyes of Chios. Karyes also goes by the name of Arahova (not to be confused with Arahova of Boetia, Greece) which was thought to have originated from the Slavic word for walnut. The village of Karyes is the birthplace of the six caryatid maidens which are featured in architecture in the place of columns on the ancient and world famous Erectheion of the Athenian Acropolis.

== The Caryatids ==
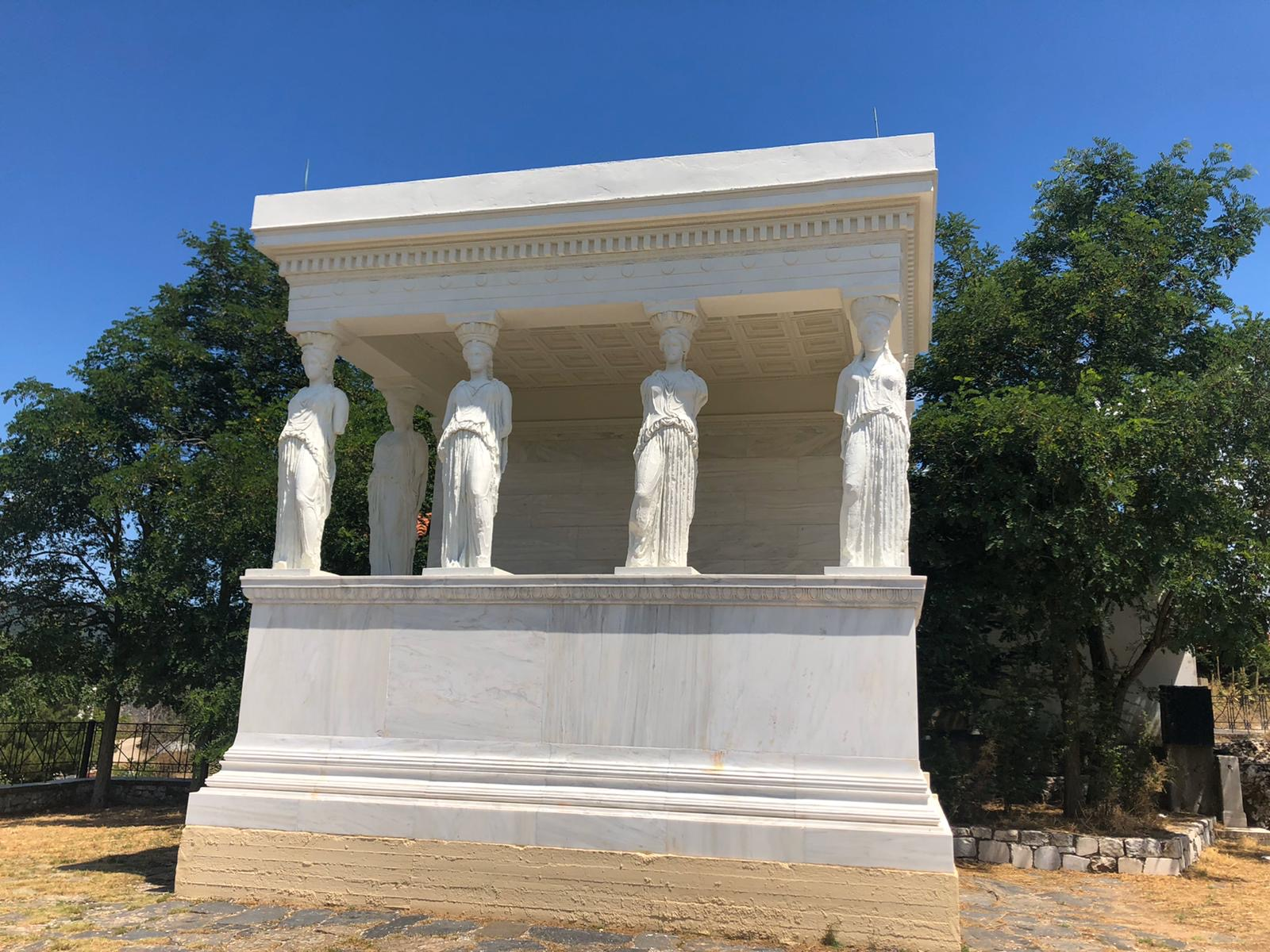

The original caryatid maidens of the Acropolis were replaced by replicas due to air pollution and five of the six originals are now housed in the Acropolis Museum in Athens. The sixth caryatid was stolen (unproven) by the command of British Lord Elgin and is now held in the British Museum in London. There are two different views for the meaning behind the caryatid maidens in the literature, the first being a maiden dancer from the village of Karyes and the second an imprisoned slave. Geographer Pausanias’ historical account from the second century AD discusses the history behind the Caryatid statues as representing dancers from Karyes. He states every year in Karyes the Lacedaemonian, virgin dancers would perform the dance of ‘caryatis’ around a statue of the goddess Artemis Caryatis at a summer festival called Karyateia. The original caryatids were dancers from Karyes but later, any female from the Laconian area who performed this dance was also called a caryatid. Pausanias also mentions a temple of Artemis located in Karyes and says that she was sacred in this area.

Roman architect, writer and engineer Vitruvius had his own opinion on the history behind the caryatids. Vitruvius claims that the caryatids were maidens of Karyes who were held captive as slaves, as a form of punishment for siding with the Persian enemies against the Spartans. He believes they were later depicted in Greek architecture as holding a great burden for being traitors and their presence in architecture was a way of commemorating this betrayal. Other authors and scholars reject Vitruvious' view such as German poet and critic Lessing who critiqued this theory as he could find no historical evidence or documents to support his claims and thus argued that his view was a myth and confabulation. Frank Granger suggested that he perhaps confused Karyes for another town called Caria, of Asia Minor which was said to have been implicated in collaborating with the Persian enemy.

== History ==
=== 4–5th century BC ===
The village name of Karyes has carried from ancient times as there has been an abundance of walnut trees since then. Various objects and fragments which were found during digging, have provided physical evidence for the ancient settlement in Karyes and the caryatid monument is said to be currently positioned in the place of the ancient acropolis of Karyes. During the years before Christ, the people of the Peloponnese were polytheistic and worshipped many Gods, Goddesses and various nymphs, which explains the worship of goddess Artemis in this area. The Peloponnese consisted of a lot of different municipalities, Tegea, Arcadia, Messinia, Laconia (including the city of Sparta) and they all had their own heads of state. During this time the Spartans had a lot of conflict and they involved themselves in a lot of different wars such as the first and second Messinian wars, the Peloponnesian war and the Greco-Persian Wars. Karyes had its own army of around 600 men and they generally supported the Spartans. Karyes took part in the Trojan war along with the Spartans, and they were also allies with the Spartans in the Persian war. The Spartans respected the Karyates because of their bravery and endurance, but the Karyates preferred to deal with and be part of Arcadia and Tegea as the Spartans were very strict, regimented and difficult in their ways. Karyes was part of Sparta until 338 BC when Philip II of Macedon came to the Peloponnese for a meeting, where all the Greeks except the Spartans recognised him as their leader. As a result, the Spartans were punished, their power began to decline and the people of Tegea, Messinia and Karyes then regained their independence.

=== Roman and Byzantine Period ===
Goth Alaric I who was King of the Visigoths in 370 - 410 AD invaded and took over a number of areas in Greece and villages of the Peloponnese including the city of Argos, Arcadia and also Karyes in 396 AD. The Goths looted and destroyed everything in these villages but after some time in 403 AD they gained the attention of Roman General Flavius Stilicho who came to the Peloponnese and killed and pushed a lot of them out of the area. When the goths were kicked out, the people from Karyes started to rebuild their life and towns. The Byzantine era came about a few hundred years after the Roman occupation in Greece and during this period, Greece became part of the Eastern Roman Empire and the Greek city of Constantinople was made capital of the Byzantine. The founding father of Byzantium was emperor Constantine I who ruled from 306 – 337 AD. Due to emperor Constantine's support of Christianity, this period saw the shift away from paganism towards the Christianisation of society, except the north part of Laconia which remained polytheistic up until 867 – 866 AD. Also during this era, Slavic people came to the area of Laconia and to Karyes and settled peacefully by adopting Christianity and assimilating with the local Greeks.

=== Ottoman Period and the burning of Arachova ===
Greece was under Ottoman occupation for hundreds of years from the 1400s until the Greek War of Independence began in 1821. In an attempt to stop the revolution by the Greeks, the Peloponnese was invaded in 1826 by a Turkish army led by a general named Ibrahim. On 12 May they came to siege and destroy Karyes and the residents fled to the mountains with whatever possessions they could carry and hid in caves. Karyes was burnt down to the ground with the exception of seven or eight houses and the church of Saint Paraskevi. The Turkish troops returned three months later with 1500 men, but this time they were attacked by the Greek forces and suffered a loss in which 185 soldiers were killed, many Greek prisoners were released and Ibrahim and his army were chased out of the village.

=== World War II ===
World War II occurred in Southern Europe in 1941 and Karyes was invaded by the Nazi Axes Forces for the first time on 18 December 1942. Fearing for their lives, many of the residents fled the village and took refuge in huts they had built in the mountains. The Italians who were allies with Germany, terrorised the remaining villagers by kidnap, torture, shooting and burning a number of houses before leaving the village. Some of the soldiers stayed in the village where they tortured, bribed and threatened the residents for provisions such as food, wine and livestock. At 5am on 19 September 1943, Karyes was invaded again by German troops and the bell of Saint John church rang to give warning to the residents. As the residents were woken up from their sleep it was too late for them to escape to the mountains and the whole village was seized by panic as flares and machine guns fired and grenades exploded. In this invasion, twelve people were killed, four were injured and thirty one people were taken as hostages. This invasion was finally brought to an end when an International Red Cross representative named Alexander Perrson visited Karyes. On 26 November 1943, 118 elite and educated people from Laconia were captured by the Nazi Forces. This attack was said to be a form of revenge by the Germans for an attack done by rebels of Monodentri. Among this group doctor Christos Karvounis from Karyes who completed his studies in Germany was recognised by one of the army men. The soldiers were going to let him go but he pleaded with them and said that he will not leave without the others, but his plea was ignored and all the 118 people were killed. Kostas Pitsius who kept a diary at the time recorded that on 15 March 1944, Karyes was burned down by the German troops. Around 150 men arrived and the bell of Saint Andreas church sounded to warn the villagers, who quickly ran to hide in the mountains, forest and around the village. The village was completely looted for any jewellery, tools, livestock, clothes and furniture and the school and town clock were blown up. 8 people were killed and over 200 houses were burnt down. Around 40 houses were saved with the help of some women who cleverly put out some of the major fires and set fires to objects such as clothes and sheets on top of stone or steel, to deceive the Germans and save their homes. The next day after more destruction and burning, they loaded everything in their cars and mules and began to leave. Another 46 people that were taken as prisoners were shot dead on 21 March. From June – July 1944 Karyes experienced its final and most terrifying Nazi invasion on Parnon mountain which lasted 15 days. The troops completely destroyed everything and there was further torture and shootings, in which a total of 250 people from 15 nearby villages were killed, including 14 people from Karyes. In September, as Hitler was losing the war, the troops began to retreat and by 18 October all the bells started to ring and gave the final signal of freedom that all the Germans had left Laconia.

=== Contemporary Karyes ===
As of 2001 Karyes has around 729 permanent residents which is a lot less than the pre-war population of 2180. The current Karyes features a main town square where there are coffee shops, bars and restaurants and 40 metres from the Town Square there is a beautiful church called Saint Andreas. 100 metres from the Town Square there is another shopping area which consists of a supermarket, fruit market, bread shop and cake shop. The church of Assumption dedicated to Jesus' mother Mary was built in the 1900s and according to Pausanias, where this church stands was once the temple of Artemis Caryatis. In the courtyard of this church there are a number of eternal plane trees and legend says that they were planted by King Menelaus, King of Sparta near a spring around 1100 BC, but their exact age has not been determined. Similarly, Pausanias also mentions some plane trees planted by King Menalaus close by to a spring and temple in Arcadia. There is a modern version of the town clock tower which was built in 1955, as the previous one which was built in 1930 was blown up in the 1944 Nazi invasion. Majority of people from the village work as farmers producing vegetables and fruit and looking after their livestock such as goats, sheep, chickens and tending to their bee farms. Karyes holds an annual festival on 26 and 27 July to celebrate two religious Saint's days where there are feasts, music, dancing and other festivities.

== Geography ==
Karyes is located in the southern part of Greece within the Peloponnese peninsula. It is about 40 km North-East from the major city of Sparta near the border of the two states, Laconia and Arcadia and roughly midway between Tripoli and Sparta. It is situated at the foot of Parnon mountain around 980 metres above sea level and is made up of a partly flat and partly mountainous terrain with some of the houses being built on hills and slopes. Northwest of the village there is a hill with a church on top of it called Saint Elias and East of the village there is a hill with another church on top of it called Saint Constantine.

== Municipality ==
Since the 2011 local government reform Karyes is part of the municipality Sparta, Laconia, of which it is a municipal unit with an area of 64.426 km^{2}.

== Places of Interest ==
- Town Square
- Caryatid Monument
- Clock Tower
- Karyes primary school
- Monument of the 118 soldiers (on the road from Sparta to Karyes)
- Eternal Plane Trees
- Church of Assumption
- Church of Saint Andreas
- Church of Saint Demetrios
- Church of Saint John
- Church of Saint Constantine
- Church of Saint Elias

== Gallery ==
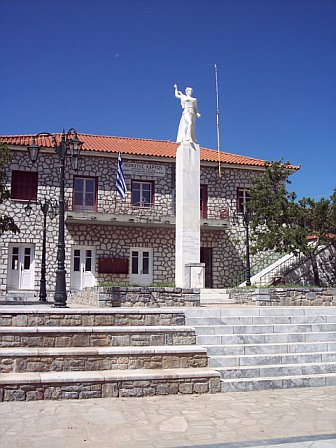
Government Building in the Town Square

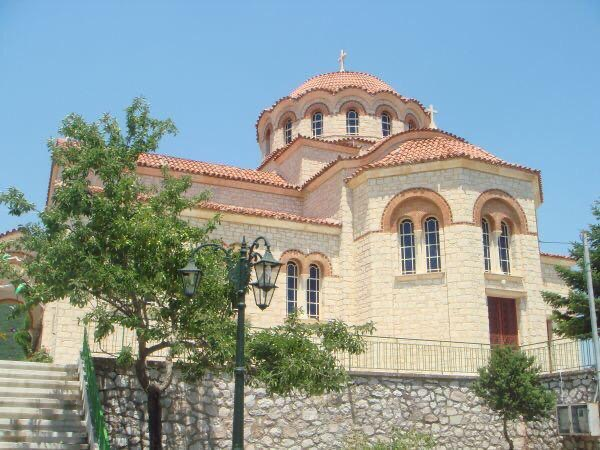
Church of Saint Andreas in the Town Square

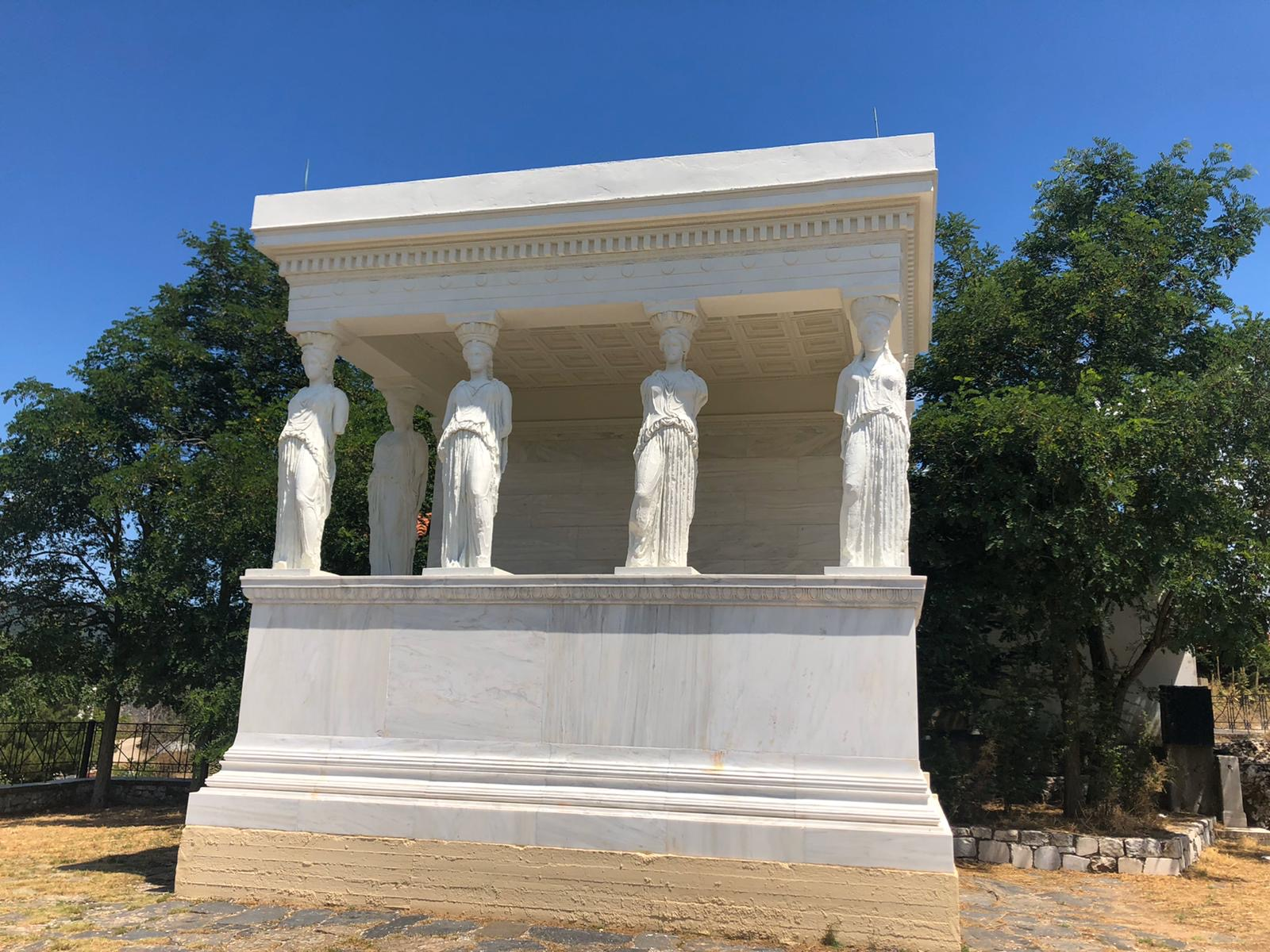
Caryatid monument, Karyes Laconia

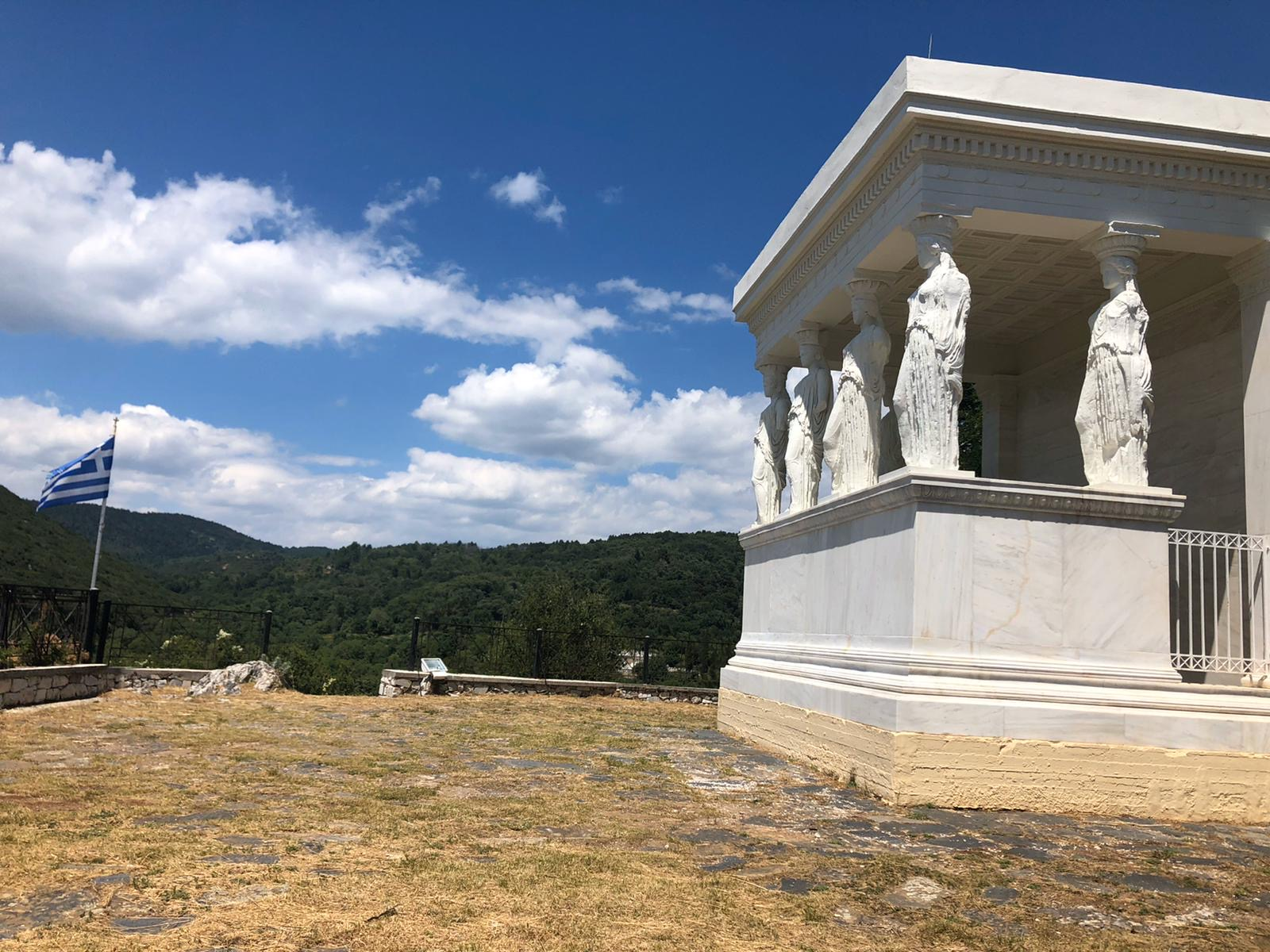
Caryatids monument side view, Karyes of Laconia

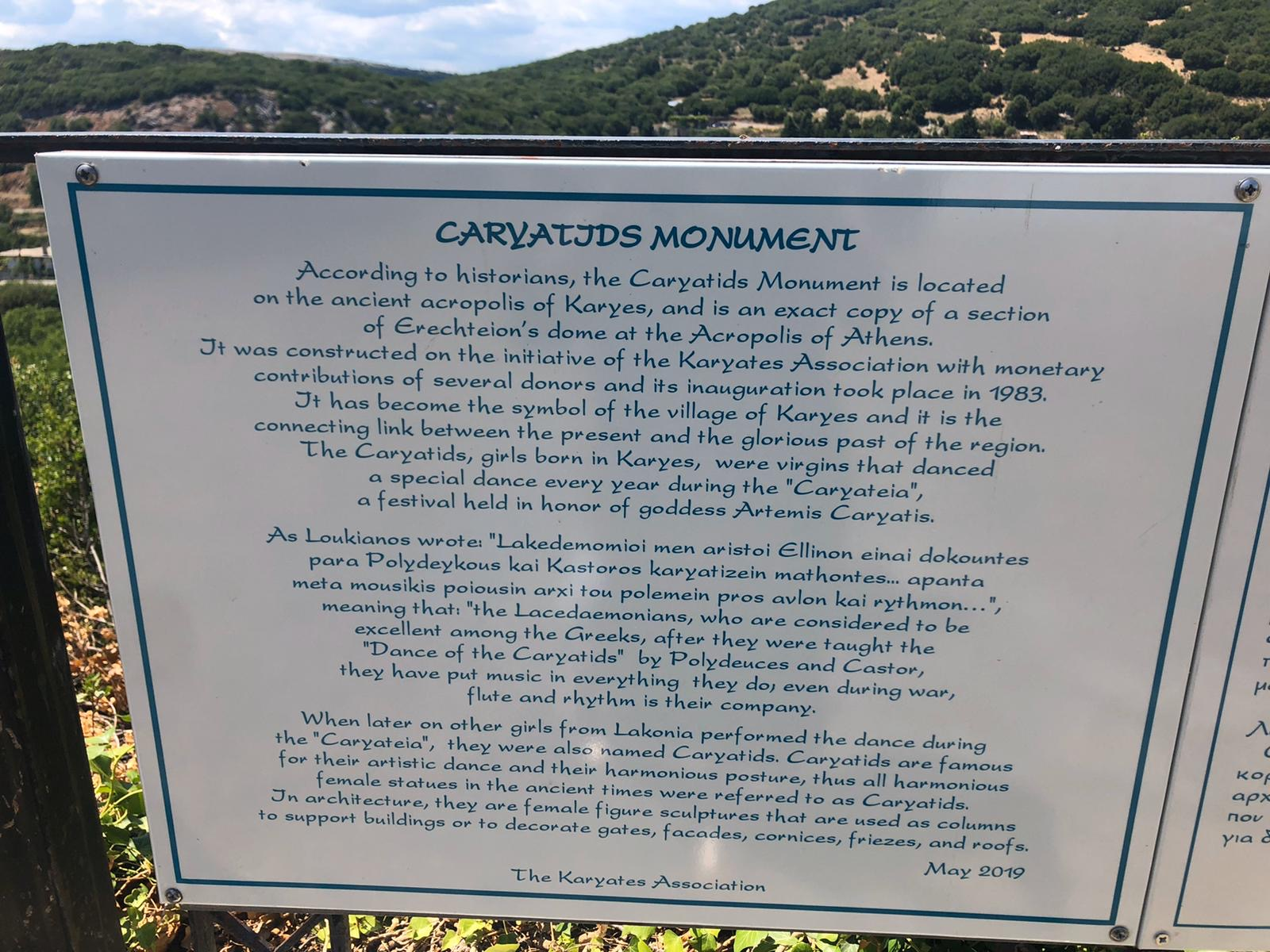
Inscription of Caryatid monument

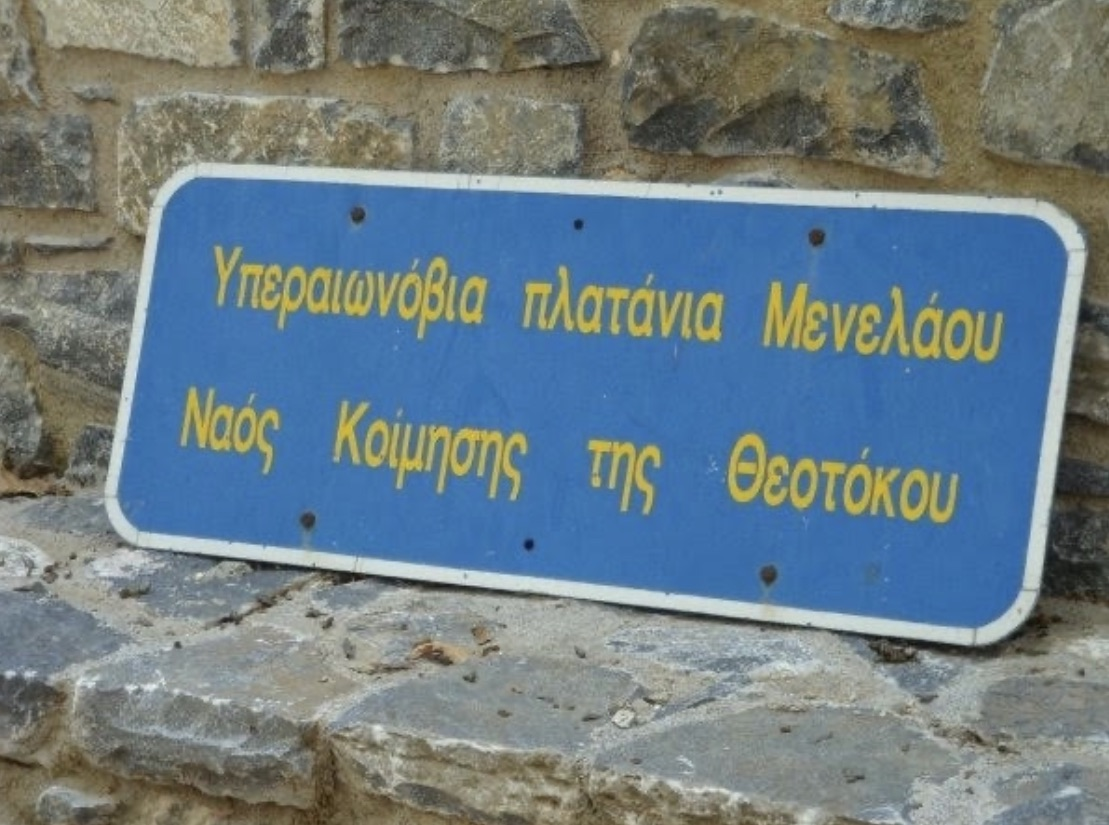
Menalaus planes sign

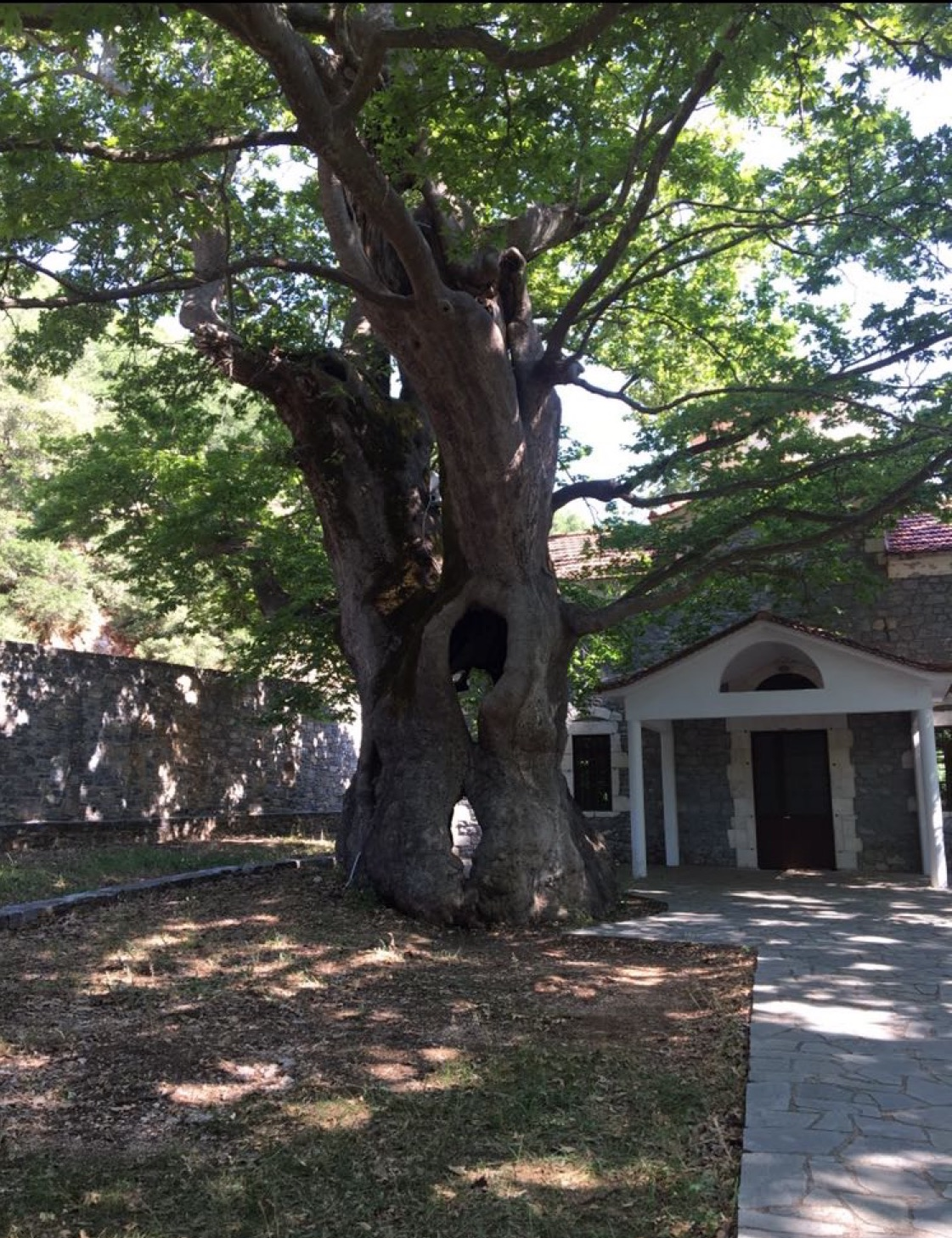
Church of assumption and eternal plane tree. Karyes, Laconia

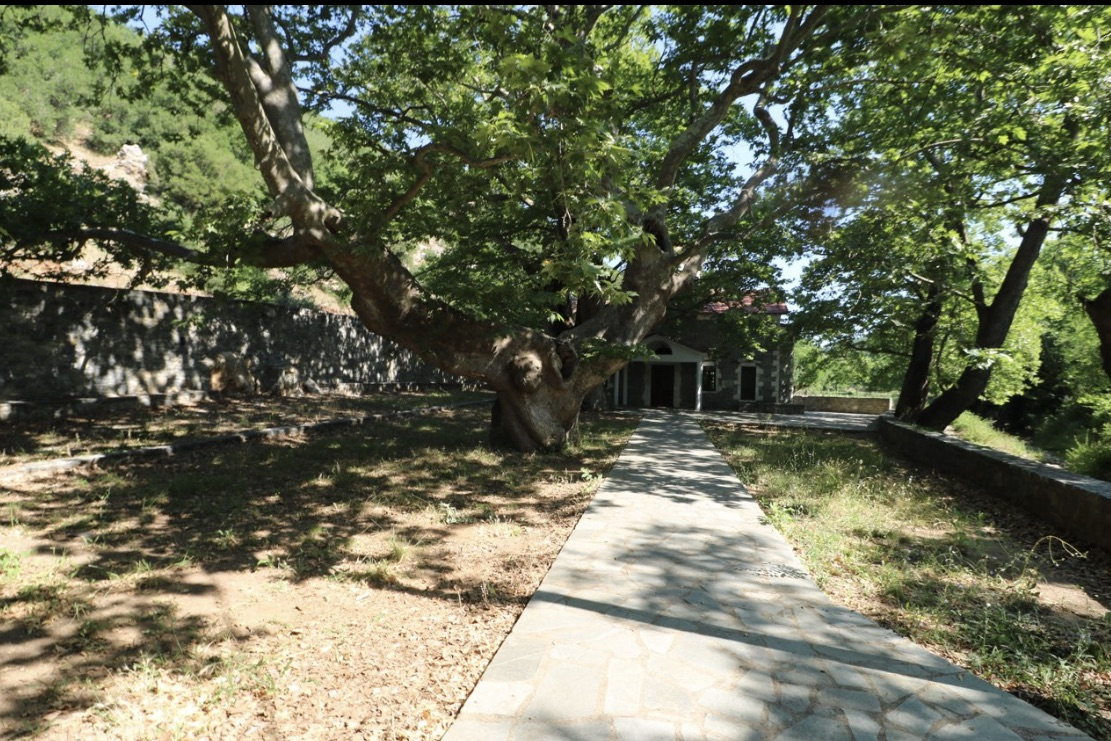
Courtyard of the Church of Assumption with plane trees. Karyes, Laconia

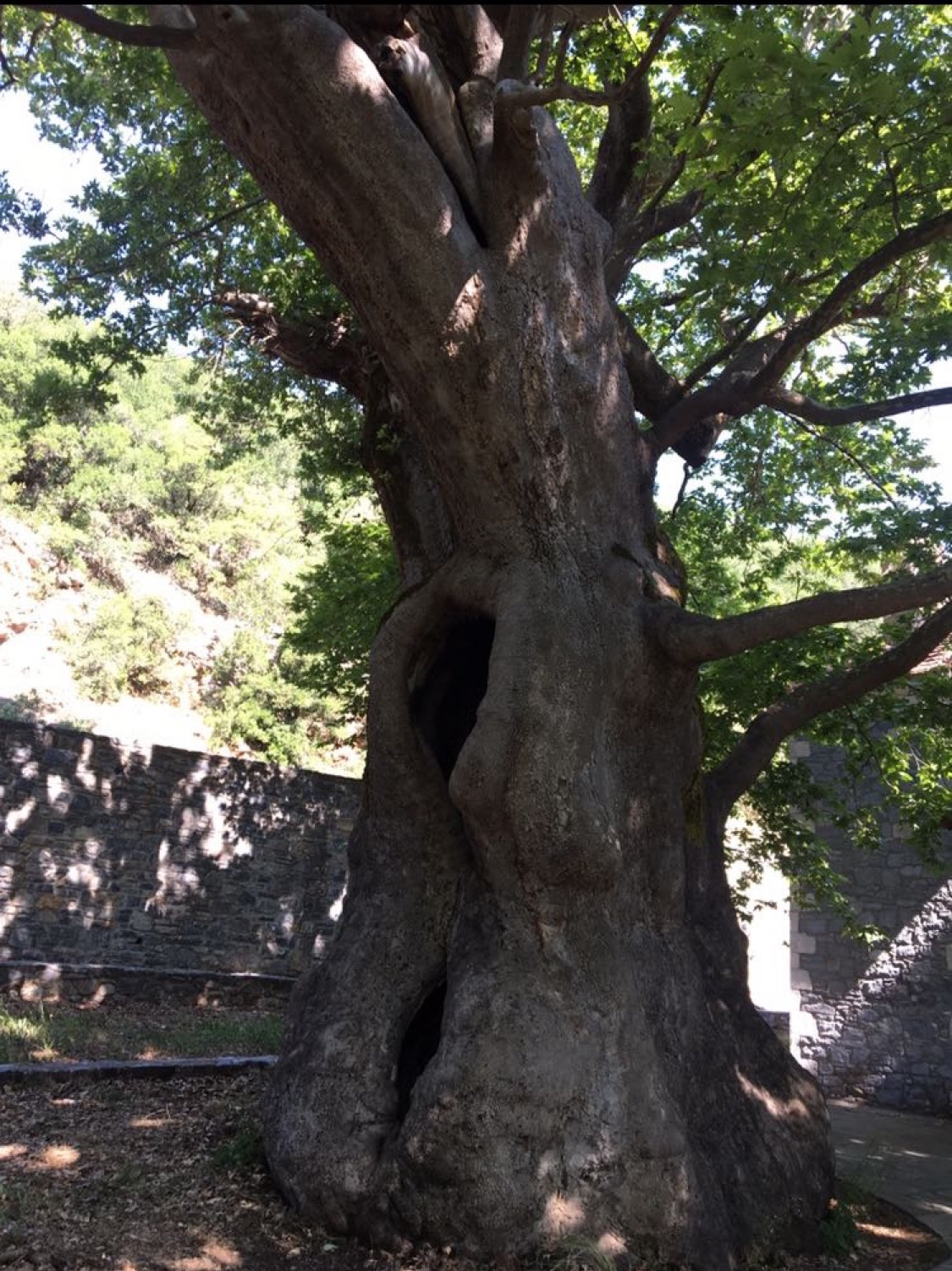
Eternal Plane tree

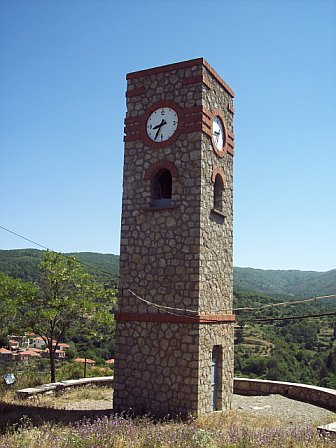
Clock tower, Karyes Laconia

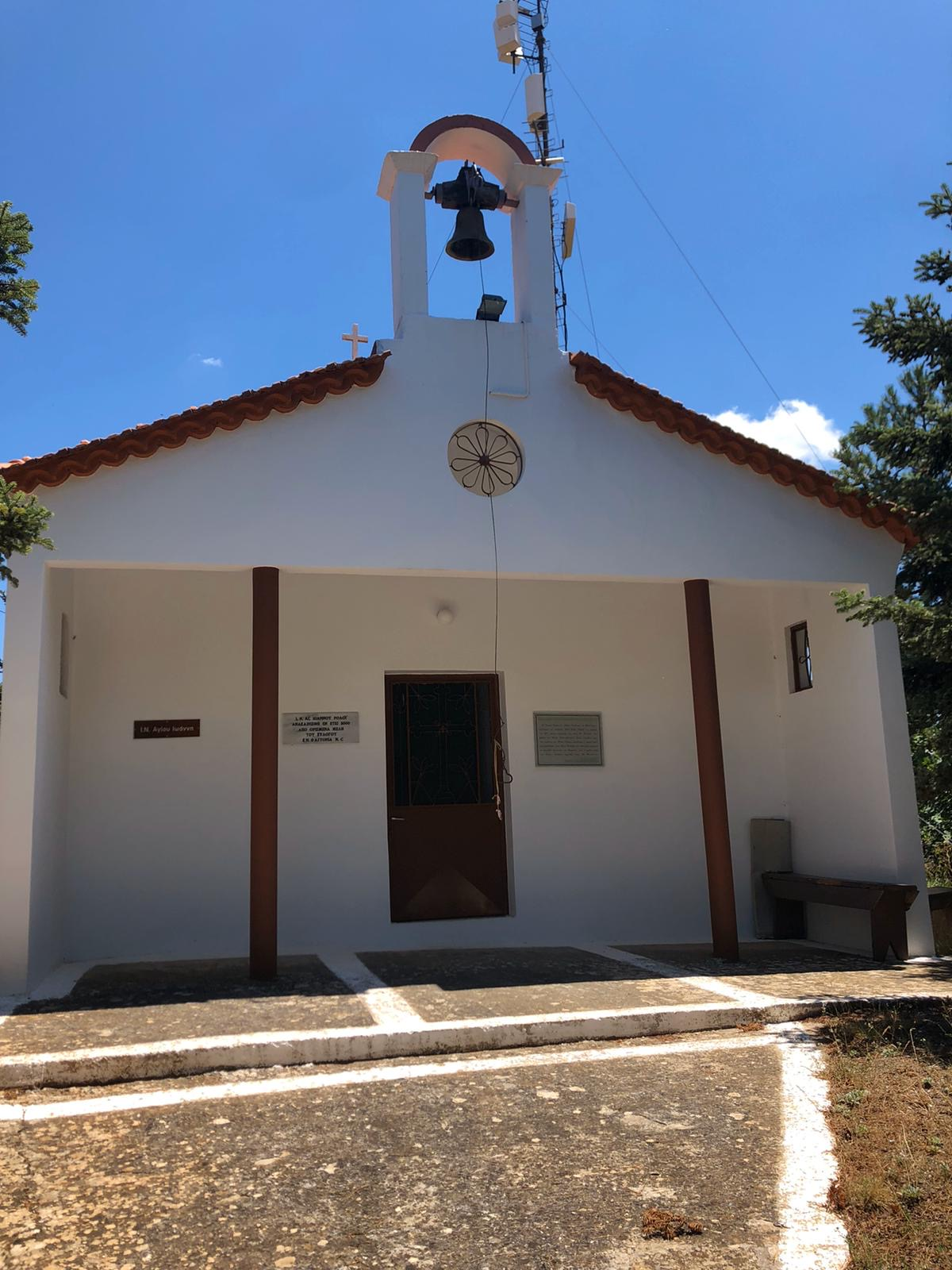
Church of Saint John. Karyes, Laconia

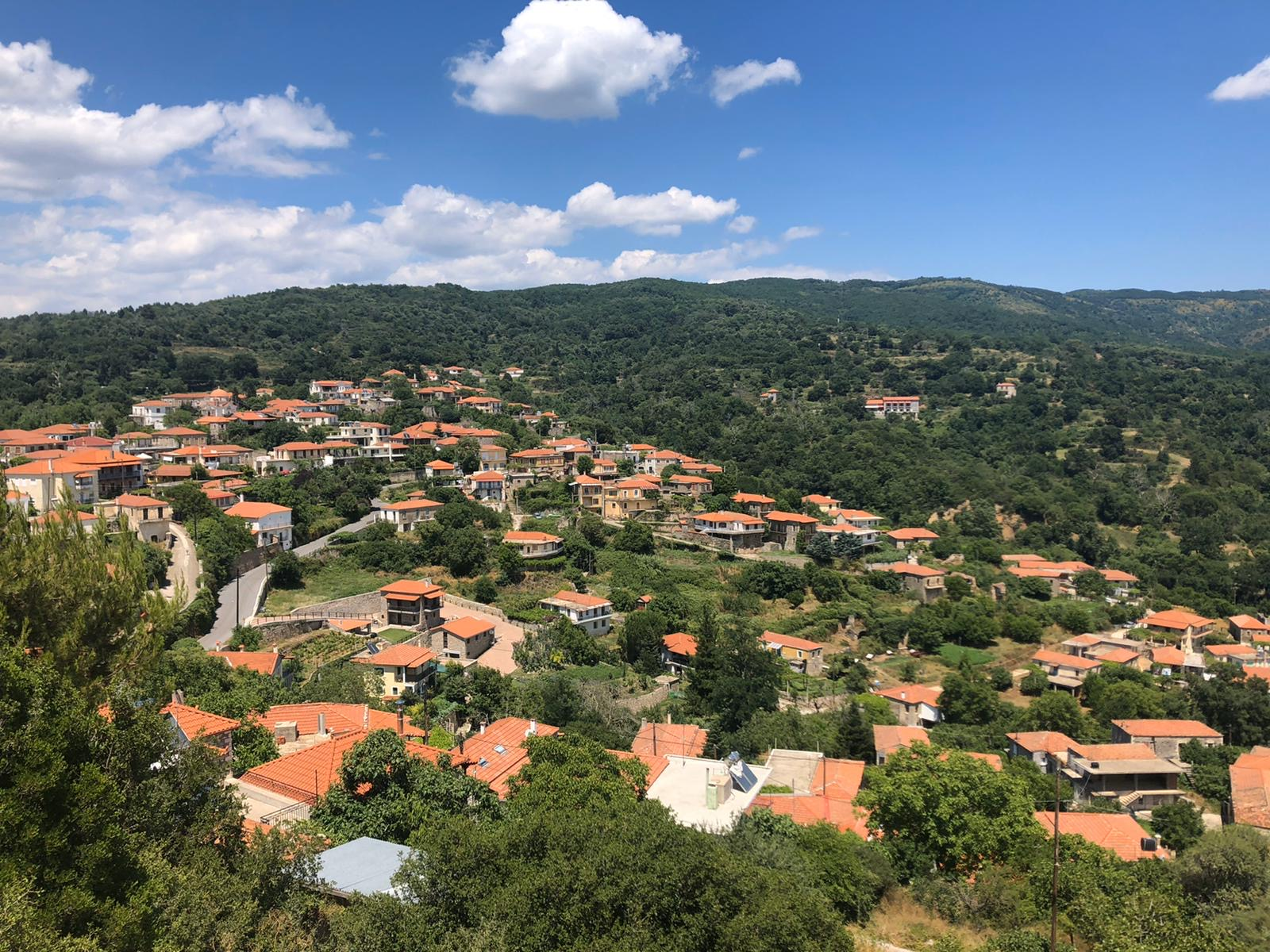
View of Karyes, Laconia

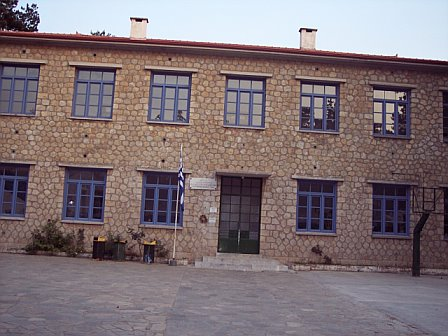
Karyes Primary School

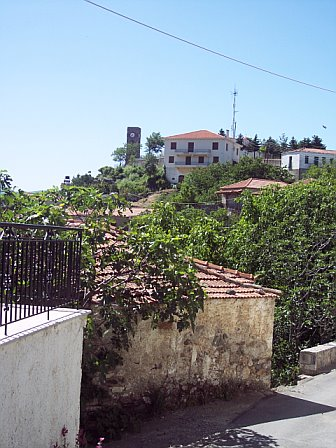
Arahova hill, Karyes

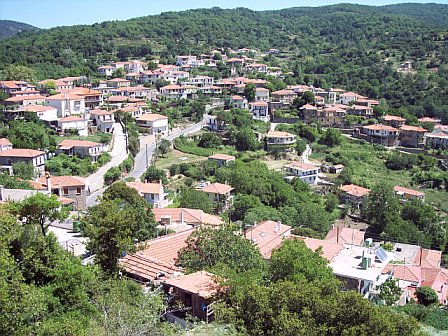
Karyes view

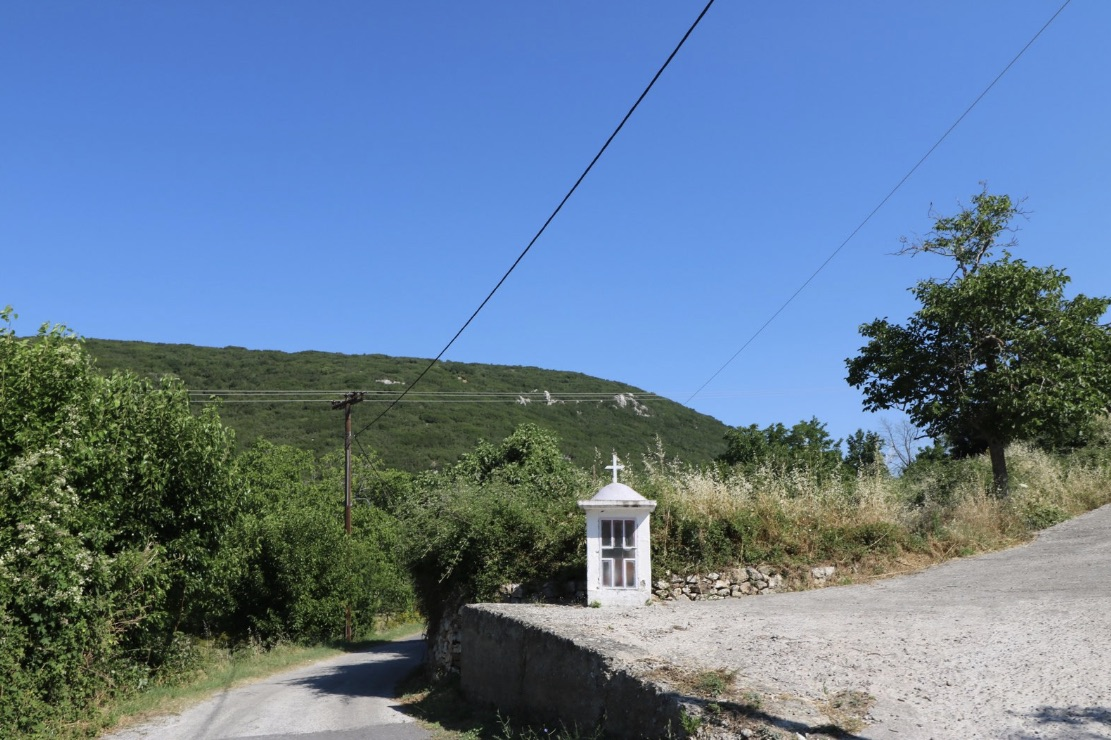
Another Karyes View
