= Ano Milia =

Ano Milia Άνω Μηλιά
- Settlement
- Location within Greece
- Coordinates: 40°14.8′N 22°16.1′E
- Country: Greece
- Administrative region: Central Macedonia
- Regional unit: Pieria
- Municipality: Katerini
- Municipal unit: Petra
- Community: Milia
- Elevation: 950 m (3,120 ft)

Population (2021)
  - Total: 19
- Time zone: UTC+2 (EET)
  - Summer (DST): UTC+3 (EEST)
- Postal code: 601 00
- Area code: +30-2351
- Vehicle registration: KN

Ano Milia (Greek: Άνω Μηλιά) is a village of the Katerini municipality. Before the 2011 local government reform it was part of the municipality of Petra. The 2021 census recorded 19 inhabitants in the village. Ano Milia is a part of the community of Milia.

== History ==
The village has visible ruins of the infimus tower of the Lazas family the famus Klephts and Armatoles of the erea during the end of the Ottoman occupation. Near the ruins stands a monument that the local munincipality build.

In a small tree near a small church (built in 2014) a metall cross is visible in the center of the tree in beetwen two brunches that was placed be the orthodox Isapostole Saint Cosmas of Aetolia in 1763 A.D. later in modern days the small church was built for the Saint's remebrance.

Near the entrance of the village there are also ruins of the church of Saint Athanasius a church that was lit in fire by the Axis in 1943 during the second world war. The church ruins where partially restored in 2018 an the first divine liturgy was held after 75 years.

According to the respective census data, the population of the village was 62 in 1940, 43 in 1991 and 55 in 2001.

At the height of 1050 meters from sea level stands The Mountain Refuge of the Mountaineering Club of Katerini (EOS) that can host 62 people and natural water from water spring.

== See also ==
- List of settlements in the Pieria regional unit
