= Milia, Pieria =

Milia Μηλιά
- Community
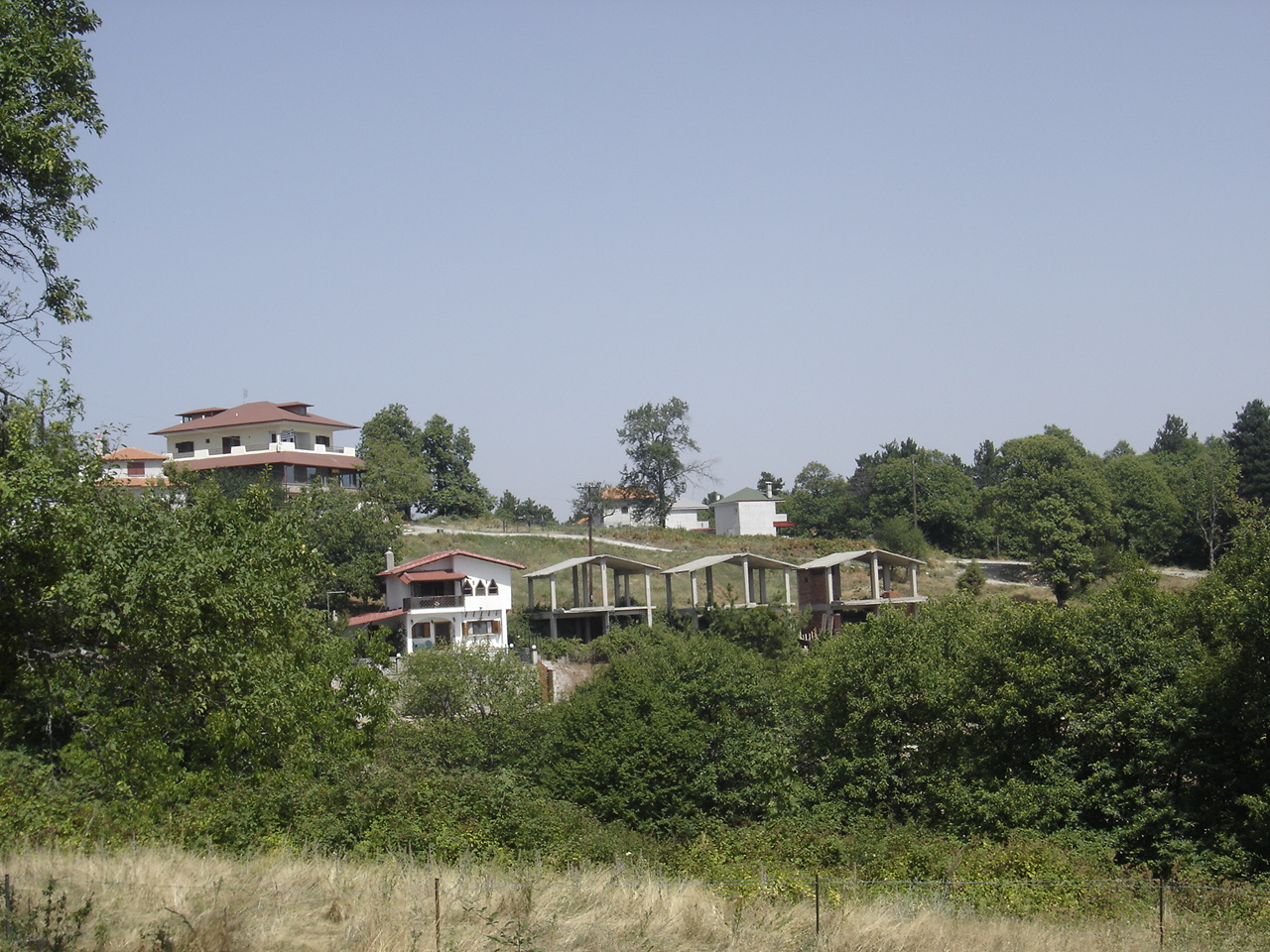
- View of Mountain huts of Ano Milia.

- Location within Greece
- Coordinates: 40°15′N 22°20.5′E
- Country: Greece
- Administrative region: Central Macedonia
- Regional unit: Pieria
- Municipality: Katerini
- Municipal unit: Petra
- Elevation: 210 m (690 ft)

Population (2021)
  - Community: 1,246
- Time zone: UTC+2 (EET)
  - Summer (DST): UTC+3 (EEST)
- Postal code: 601 00
- Area code: +30-2351
- Vehicle registration: KN

Milia (Greek: Μηλιά) is a community of the Katerini municipality in Greece. Before the 2011 local government reform it was part of the municipality of Petra. The 2021 census recorded 1246 inhabitants in the community.

== Administrative division ==
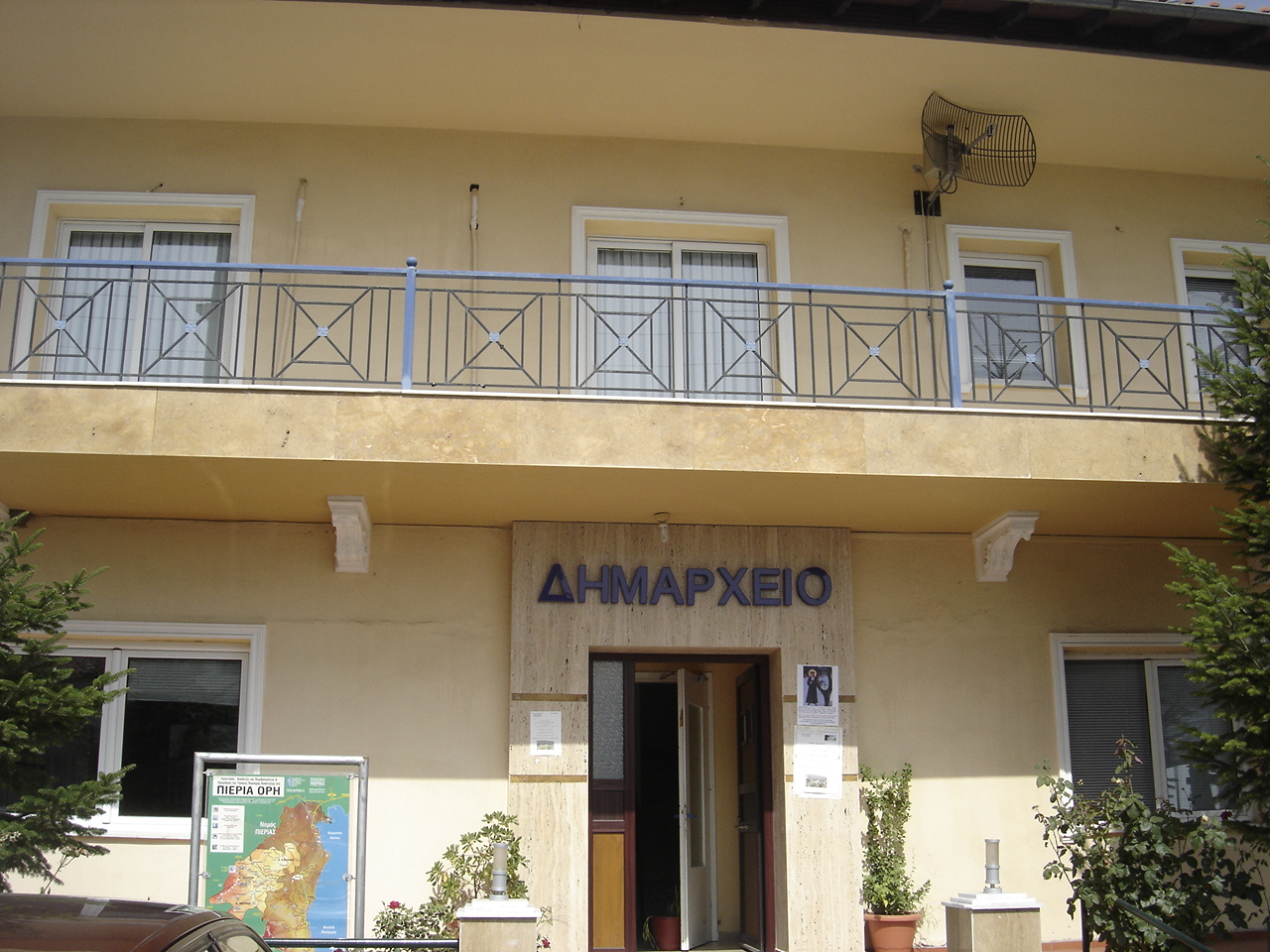
The former town hall of the Petra municipality in Kato Milia.

The community of Milia consists of five separate settlements:

- Ano Milia (population 19 in 2021)
- Karyes (population 152)
- Kato Milia (population 776)
- Mesaia Milia (population 293)
- Fteri (population 6)

The seat of the former municipality of Petra was in Mesaia Milia.

== See also ==
- List of settlements in the Pieria regional unit
