= Lofos, Pieria =

Lofos Λόφος
- Community
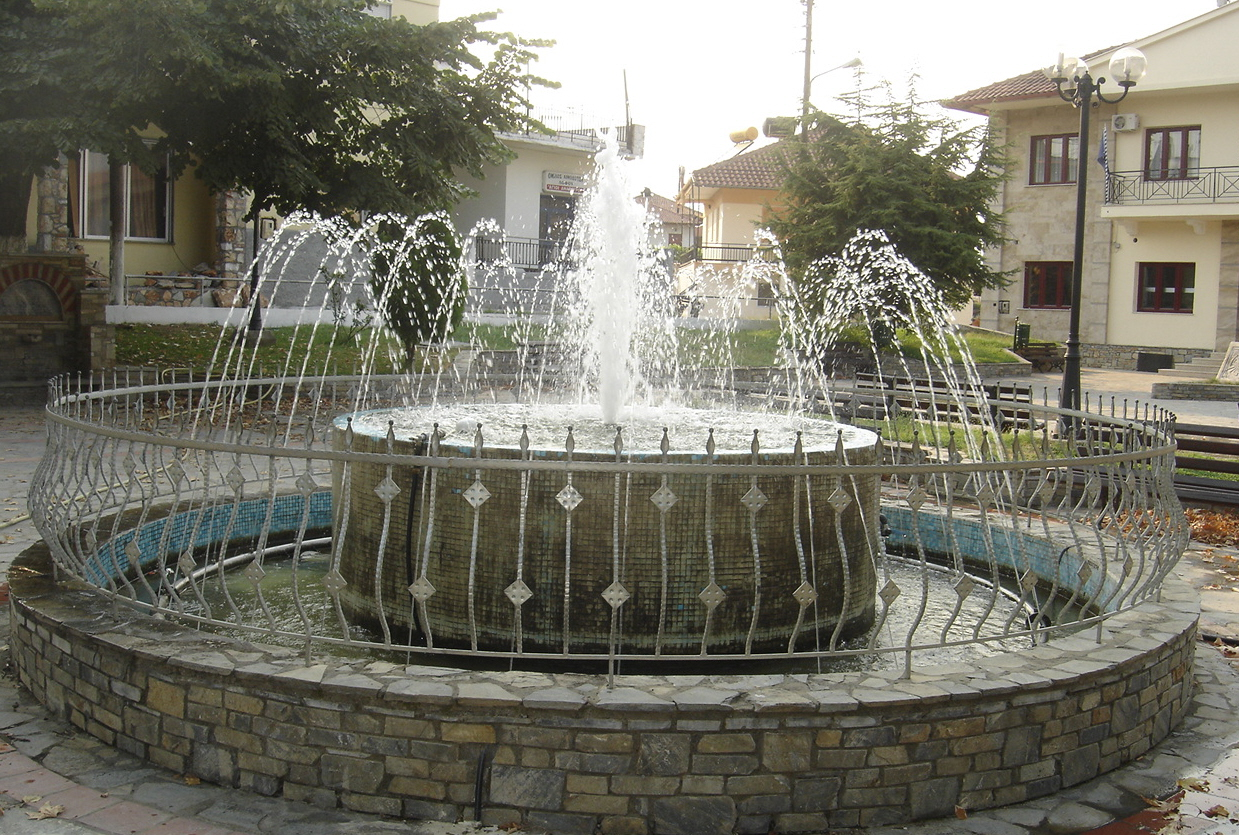
- A fountain in Lofos

- Location within Greece
- Coordinates: 40°14.5′N 22°23′E
- Country: Greece
- Administrative region: Central Macedonia
- Regional unit: Pieria
- Municipality: Katerini
- Municipal unit: Petra
- Elevation: 250 m (820 ft)

Population (2021)
  - Community: 1,694
- Time zone: UTC+2 (EET)
  - Summer (DST): UTC+3 (EEST)
- Postal code: 601 00
- Area code: +30-2351
- Vehicle registration: KN

Lofos (Greek: Λόφος) is a village and a community of the Katerini municipality. Before the 2011 local government reform, it was part of the municipality of Petra, of which it was a municipal district. The 2021 census recorded 1,694 residents in the community. The area of the community, which also contains the village of Rachi, is 20.838 km^{2} (8.046 sq mi).

== Population ==
Historical population
Year	Pop.	±%
2001	2,190	—
2011	1,919	−12.4%
2021	1,694	−11.7%

== See also ==
- List of settlements in the Pieria regional unit
