= Rachis (disambiguation) =

In biology, a rachis is a main axis or "shaft".

Rachis may also refer to:

- Rachiș, a left tributary of the river Aiud in Romania
- Rachis (gastropod), a genus of land snails

== See also ==
- Rachi (disambiguation)
- Ratchis (died after 757), King of the Lombards
