= Foteina =

Foteina Φωτεινά
- Community
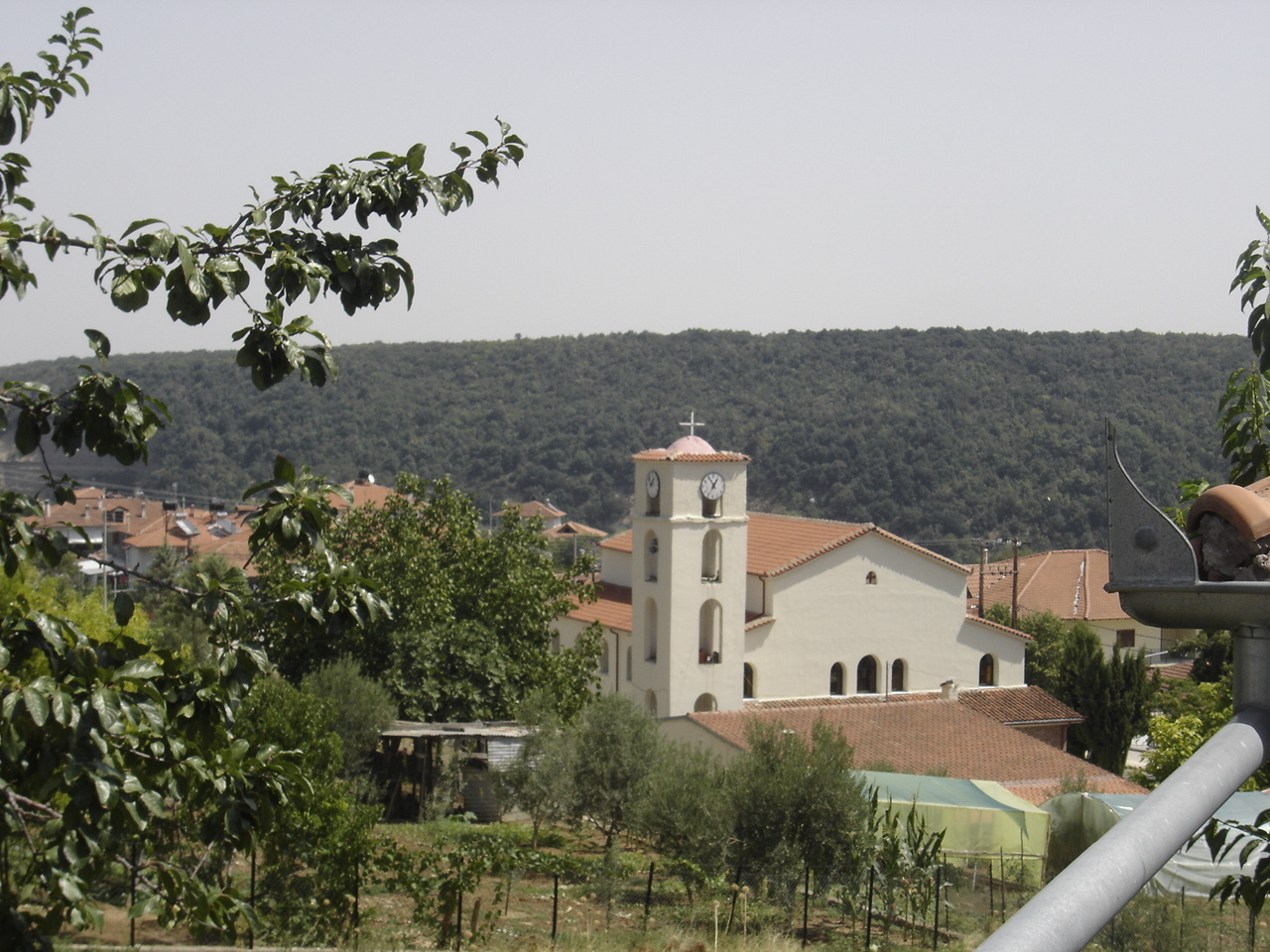
- A view of Foteina

- Location within Greece
- Coordinates: 40°13′N 22°19′E
- Country: Greece
- Administrative region: Central Macedonia
- Regional unit: Pieria
- Municipality: Katerini
- Municipal unit: Petra
- Elevation: 353 m (1,158 ft)

Population (2021)
  - Community: 303
- Time zone: UTC+2 (EET)
  - Summer (DST): UTC+3 (EEST)
- Postal code: 601 00
- Area code: +30-2351
- Vehicle registration: KN

Foteina (Greek: Φωτεινά) is a village and a community of the Katerini municipality. Before the 2011 local government reform it was part of the municipality of Petra, of which it was a municipal district. The 2021 census recorded 303 residents in the community, which also contains the village Skoteina.

== See also ==
- List of settlements in the Pieria regional unit
