= Karyes, Pieria =

Karyes Καρυές
- Settlement
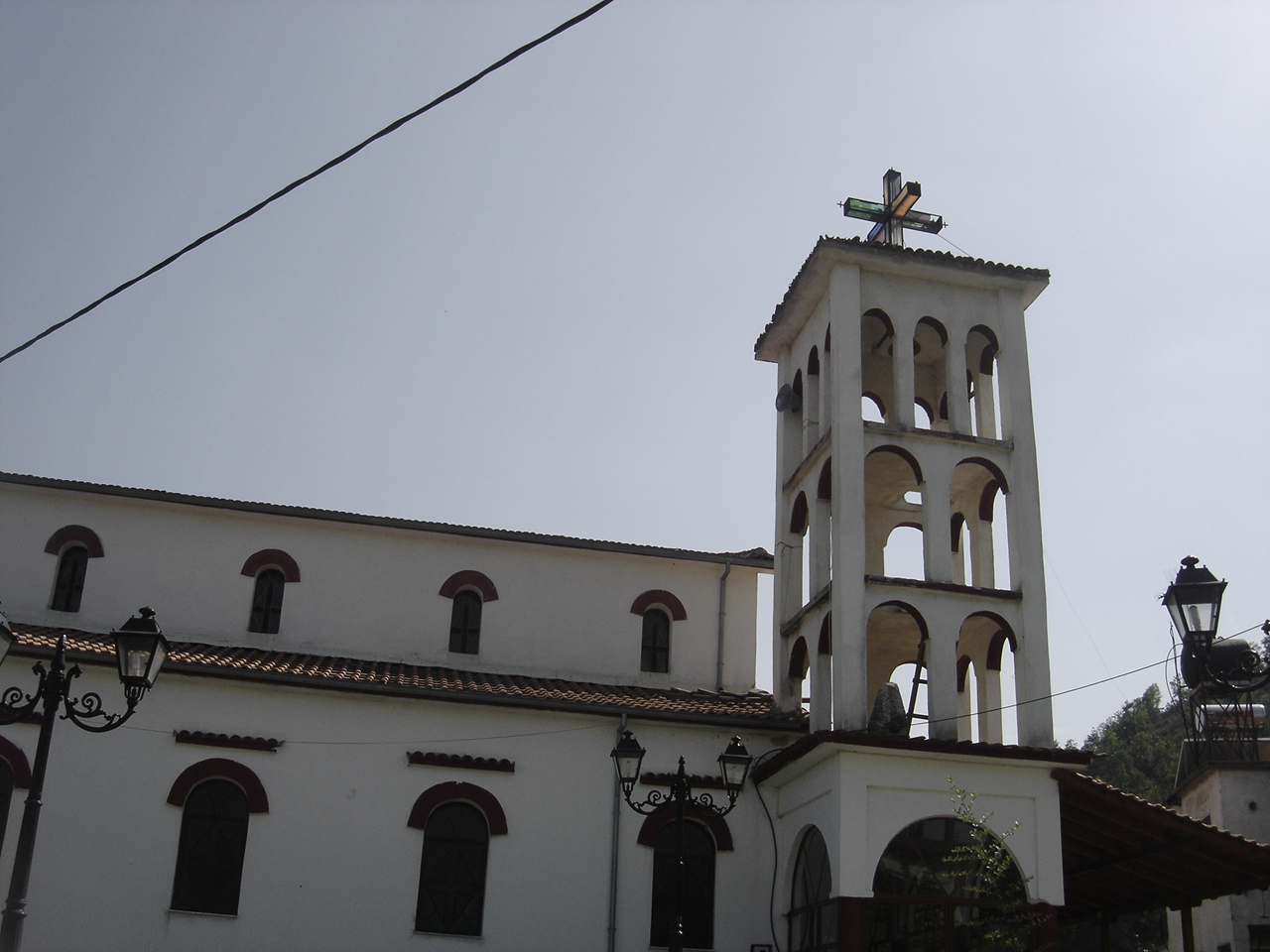
- The church of Karyes

- Location within Greece
- Coordinates: 40°14.302′N 22°17.650′E
- Country: Greece
- Administrative region: Central Macedonia
- Regional unit: Pieria
- Municipality: Katerini
- Municipal unit: Petra
- Community: Milia
- Elevation: 470 m (1,540 ft)

Population (2021)
  - Total: 152
- Time zone: UTC+2 (EET)
  - Summer (DST): UTC+3 (EEST)
- Postal code: 601 00
- Area code: +30-2351
- Vehicle registration: KN

Karyes (Greek: Καρυές) is a village of the Katerini municipality. Before the 2011 local government reform it was part of the municipality of Petra. The 2021 census recorded 152 inhabitants in the village. Karyes is a part of the community of Milia.

== See also ==
- List of settlements in the Pieria regional unit
