= Mesaia Milia =

Mesaia Milia Μεσαία Μηλιά
- Settlement
- Location within Greece
- Coordinates: 40°15′1″N 22°17′45″E
- Country: Greece
- Administrative region: Central Macedonia
- Regional unit: Pieria
- Municipality: Katerini
- Municipal unit: Petra
- Community: Milia

Population (2021)
  - Total: 293
- Time zone: UTC+2 (EET)
  - Summer (DST): UTC+3 (EEST)
- Postal code: 601 00
- Area code: +30-2351
- Vehicle registration: KN

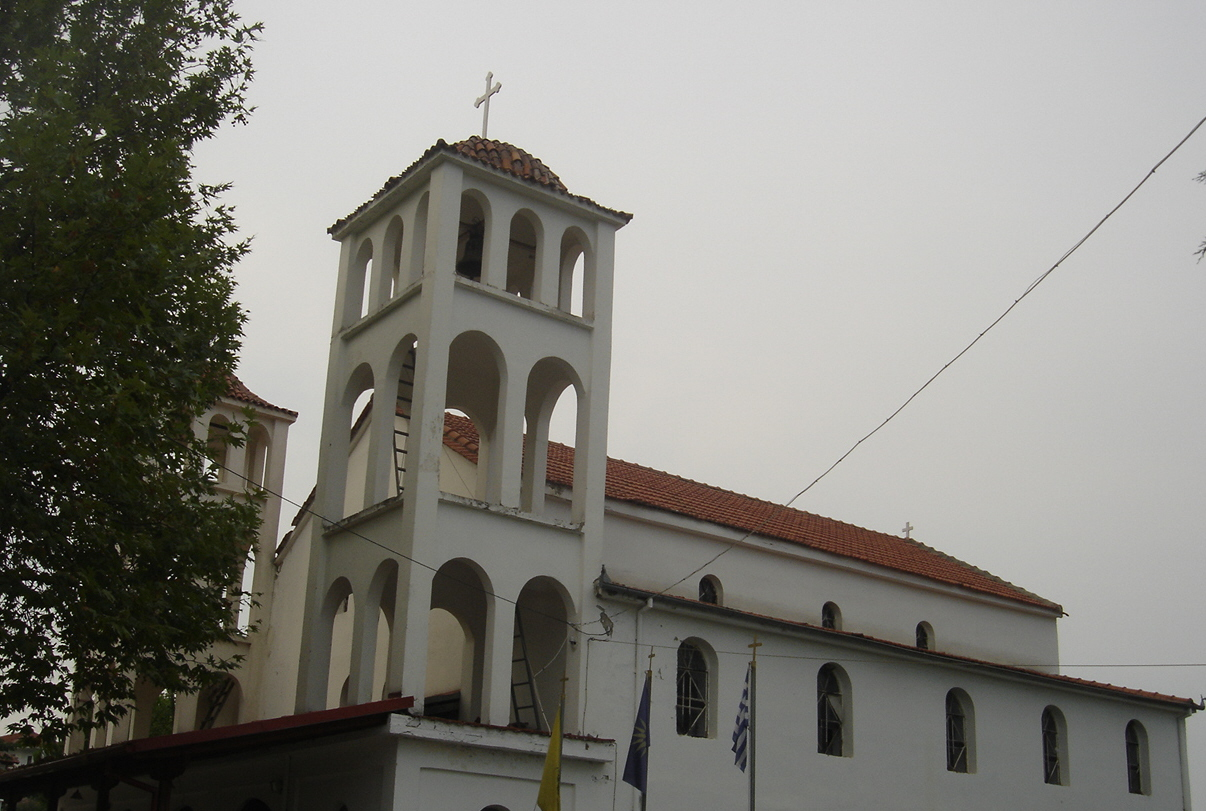

Mesaia Milia (Greek: Μεσαία Μηλιά) is a village of the Katerini municipality. Before the 2011 local government reform it was part of the municipality of Petra, of which it was the seat. The 2021 census recorded 293 inhabitants in the village. Kato Milia is a part of the community of Milia.

== See also ==
- List of settlements in the Pieria regional unit
