= Rachi, Russia =

Rachi Рачи
- Station
- Location within Amur Oblast Location within Russia
- Coordinates: 49°15′N 130°21′E
- Country: Russia
- Region: Amur Oblast
- District: Arkharinsky District
- Time zone: UTC+9:00

Rachi (Russian: Рачи) is a rural locality (a station) in Urilsky Selsoviet of Arkharinsky District, Amur Oblast, Russia. The population was 1 as of 2018. There is 1 street.

== Geography ==
The village is located on Trans-Siberian Railway, 40 km east from Arkhara and 10 km west from Uril.
