= Rachi, Pieria =

Rachi Ράχη
- Settlement
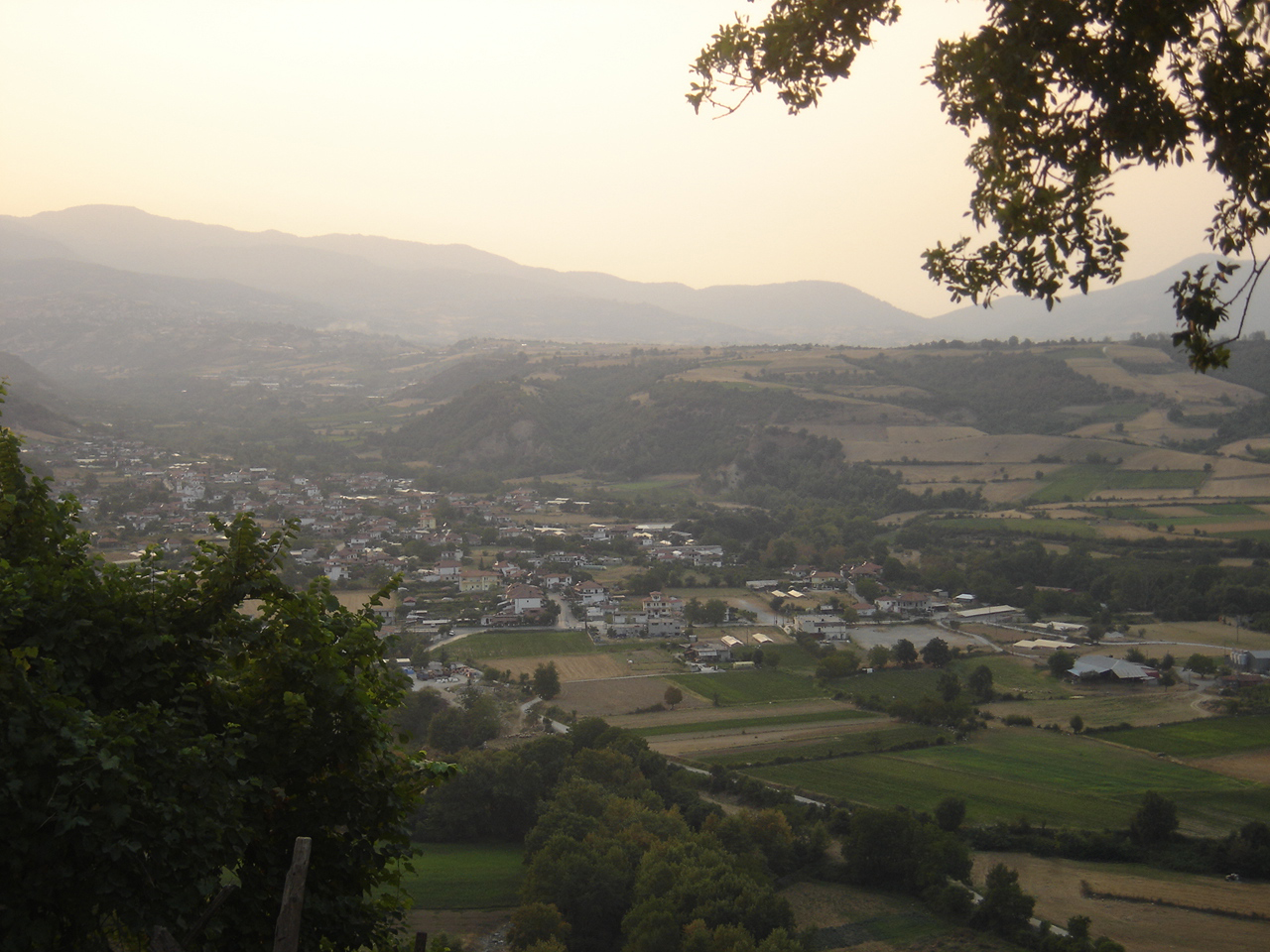
- View of Rachi

- Location within Greece
- Coordinates: 40°14.6375′N 22°21.621′E
- Country: Greece
- Administrative region: Central Macedonia
- Regional unit: Pieria
- Municipality: Katerini
- Municipal unit: Petra
- Community: Lofos
- Elevation: 255 m (837 ft)

Population (2021)
  - Total: 371
- Time zone: UTC+2 (EET)
  - Summer (DST): UTC+3 (EEST)
- Postal code: 601 00
- Area code: +30-2351
- Vehicle registration: KN

Rachi (Greek: Ράχη) is a village of the Katerini municipality. Before the 2011 local government reform it was part of the municipality of Petra. The 2021 census recorded 371 inhabitants in the village. Rachi is a part of the community of Lofos.

== See also ==
- List of settlements in the Pieria regional unit
