= Rashi Synagogue =

Orthodox synagogue in Troyes, France

- Synagogue Rachi de Troyes
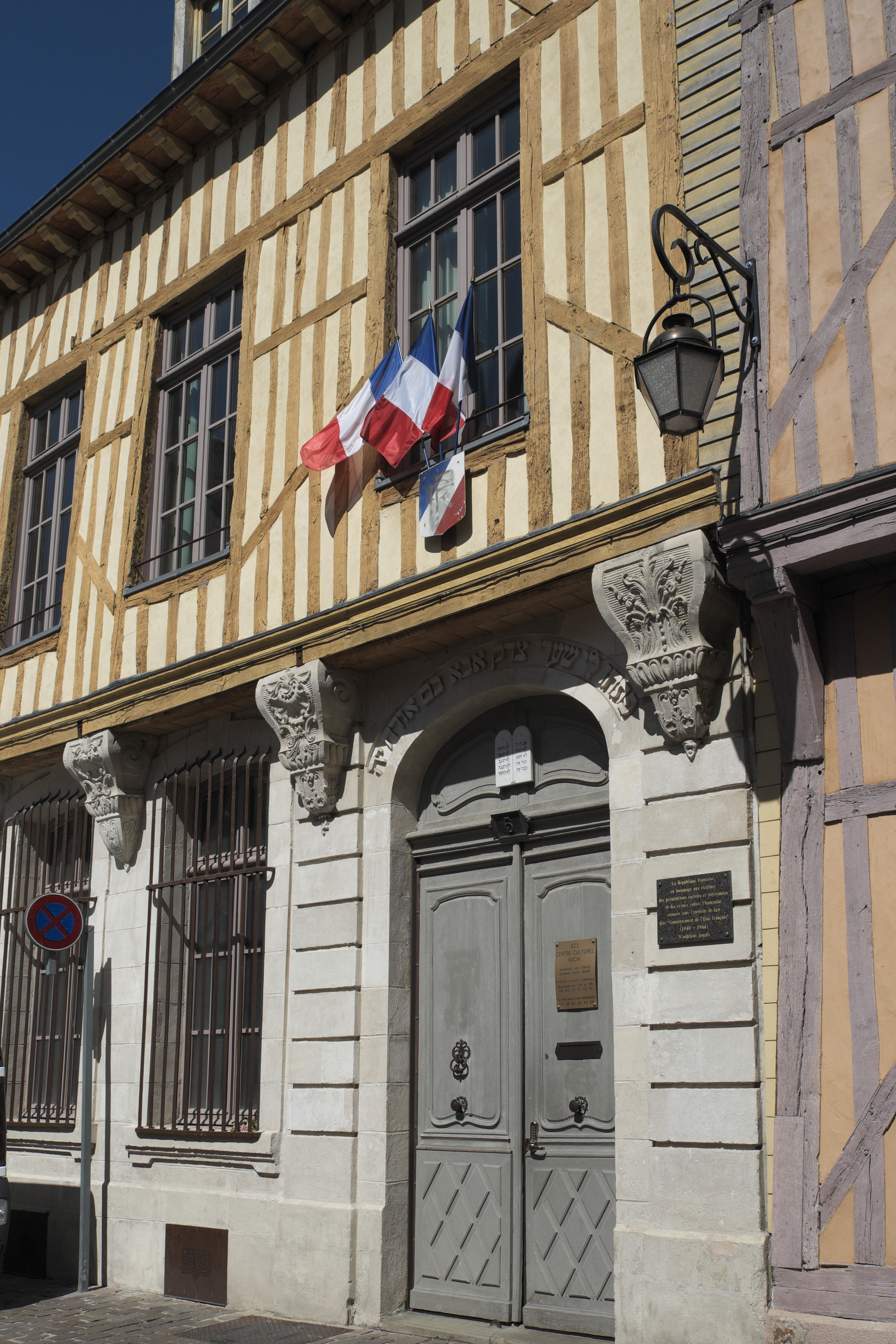
- Entrance to the synagogue, in 2015

- Location of the synagogue in France

Religion
- Affiliation: Orthodox Judaism
- Rite: Nusach Sefard
- Ecclesiastical or organisational status: Synagogue; Jewish museum
- Year consecrated: 1960
- Status: Active

Location
- Location: 5 Rue Brunneval, Troyes
- Country: France
- Coordinates: 48°17′47″N 4°04′14″E

Architecture
- Type: Church
- Style: Renaissance
- Completed: 16th century (as a church); 1960 (as a synagogue)

Website
- communaute.rachi-troyes.com

The Rashi Synagogue is an Orthodox Jewish congregation and synagogue, located on 5 rue Brunneval in Troyes, Grand Est, France. The synagogue is named after the medieval rabbi and biblical commentator Rashi, who was born and died in Troyes. A Sephardic synagogue, it is a member of the Consistoire central israélite de France. The site includes a museum, the Rashi House, a cultural center, and a library. The European University Rashi Institute, (French: L'Institut Universitaire Européen Rachi), located opposite the synagogue, is a research institute independent of the synagogue focused on Jewish studies, Semitic studies, and Monotheism.

== History ==
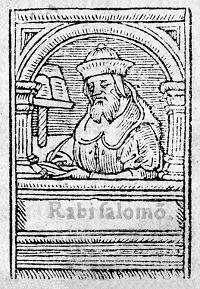
Rashi

Judaism arrived in Troyes in the 11th century, through the Champagne fairs. The Jewish population lived in the Brush District (French: Quartier de la Brosse aux juifs), at the corner of Rue Boucherat and Rue Montier la Celle. The medieval Jewish cemetery is located outside the borders of the neighborhood, across from the Troyes library.

Born Salomon Ben Isaac in 1040, Rachi was born in Troyes, which was then under the Count of Champagne. He studied Talmud at a yeshiva in Worms, a Free imperial city of the Holy Roman Empire. Upon his return to Troyes, he founded a yeshiva, developed his own commentary on the Torah and Talmud and developed a large reputation among Jewish communities of the era. Rashi died on July 13, 1105, in Troyes.

In 1285, Champagne was annexed by King Philippe IV of France, which led to the persecution of the local Jewish community. In 1288, thirteen Jews in Troyes falsely accused of blood libel were burned at the stake. The Complainte de Troyes was written in their memory. The Jewish population of Troyes was expelled soon after. Saint-Frobert Church was built on the site of the former synagogue in the Jewish quarter. In 1772, it became a factory. Today, it is used as apartments. Saint-Pantaléon Church, on Rue de la synagogue in Troyes was built on the site of another synagogue in the community.

Following the Franco-Prussian War and the German annexation of Alsace-Lorraine, a Jewish community returned to Troyes as Ashkenazi Jews from Germany moved to the city.

After the Second World War, the local Jewish community did not have a synagogue. In July 1951, Rabbi Abba Samoun arrived in Troyes to try and rebuild the community. In 1960, the Diocese of Troyes sold the rectory of Madeleine Church of Troyes, at 5 Rue Brunneval, to the community to become the new synagogue. In 1966 the community extended to 7 and 9 Rue Brunneval. The prayer hall was extended in 1986.

On 1989 the European University Rashi Institute was founded, creating a research institute open to all, partnering with the University of Reims-Champagne-Ardenne. It was opened by author Elie Wiesel and Chief Rabbi of France Samuel Sirat. It offers research programs in Jewish history, Jewish philosophy as well as modern Arabic and Hebrew. In 1990 a memorial to Rashi was dedicated in front of the Théâtre de Champagne. The memorial, designed and created by sculptor Raymond Moretti, is a black and white sphere.

On 2011, the community underwent a renovation process of the buildings. The buildings reopened on September 4, 2016, in front of Haim Korsia, Chief Rabbi of France. A museum, the Rashi House, was created, reconstructing the Rabbi's study hall.

In June 2019, the site was chosen for a world congress of Jewish women, titled "The Women of Rashi". French Rabbis Delphine Horvilleur, Pauline Bebe and Floriane Chinsky all attended.

== Description ==
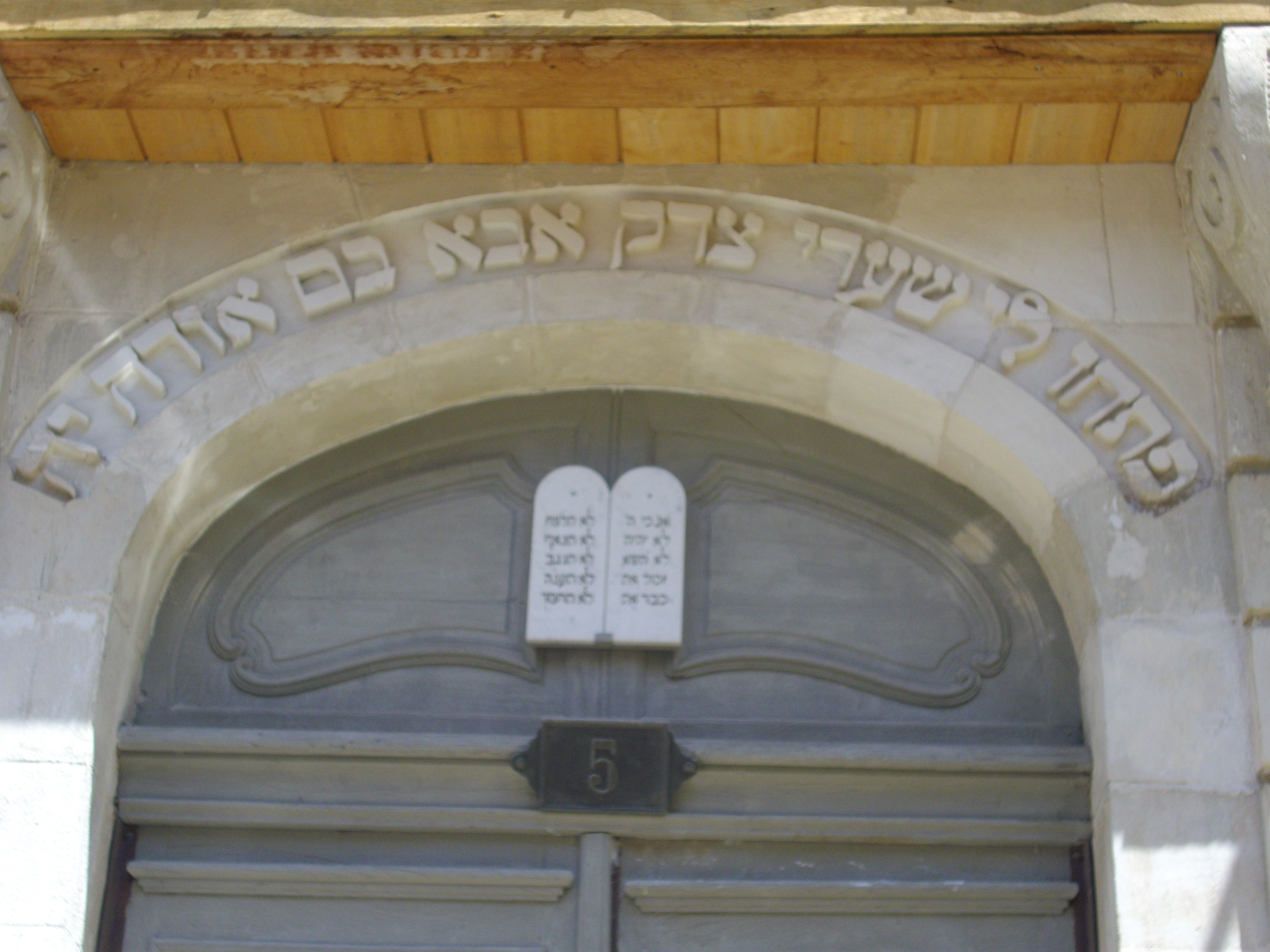
Verse of Torah and the Tablets of Stone above the entrance to the building

The building was developed on the site of a former abbey dating back to the 16th century. It was built in the Renaissance style and was restored in the 20th and 21st century. The compound is made up of a timber-frame house with corbel arches dating back to the 16th century and another house dating back to the 18th century.

The Impost and below the arch of the entrance includes a representation of the Ten Commandments. Carved into the stone arch is an excerpt from Psalm 118, verse 9, which reads: « פִּתְחוּ-לִי שַׁעֲרֵי-צֶדֶק; אָבֹא-בָם, אוֹדֶה יָהּ », translated to Open to me the Gates of Righteousness I will enter into them, I will give thanks unto the LORD. Psalm 118 is the last psalm uttered as part of the Hallel prayers, read during most biblical Jewish holidays and on days of worship.

== See also ==
- History of the Jews in France
- List of synagogues in France
