= Petra, Pieria =

Petra Πέτρα
- Municipal unit
- Location within the regional unit

- Location within Greece
- Coordinates: 40°15′N 22°21′E
- Country: Greece
- Administrative region: Central Macedonia
- Regional unit: Pieria
- Municipality: Katerini

Area
  - Municipal unit: 219.318 km^{2} (84.679 sq mi)

Population (2021)
  - Municipal unit: 4,225
  - Municipal unit density: 19.26/km^{2} (49.89/sq mi)
- Time zone: UTC+2 (EET)
  - Summer (DST): UTC+3 (EEST)
- Postal code: 601 50
- Area code: 23510
- Vehicle registration: KN

Petra (Greek: Πέτρα) is a former municipality in Pieria regional unit, Greece. Since the 2011 local government reform it is part of the municipality Katerini, of which it is a municipal unit. The municipal unit has an area of 219.318 km^{2}. The population was 4,225 in 2021. The seat of the municipality was in Mesaia Milia. Petra is also the name of a small settlement in the community Foteina, that had a population of 37 in 2011.

== Notes ==
- Travels in northern Greece By William Martin Leake page 337 ISBN 1-4021-6770-9
