= History of Pieria (regional unit) =

Map of the ancient Greek Kingdom of Macedonia

This is a reflection of the main historical events in Pieria (Πιερία), Central Macedonia.

== Location ==
Pieria is the southernmost regional unit of the Central Macedonia region, with the capital Katerini; Pieria is bordered to the south by Thessaly.

== History ==
=== Neolithic period, ca. 6500 to 3000 BC ===
In the 7th millennium BC, the area around Mount Olympus and the Pieria Mountains was settled, possibly from the east. The environment offered the settlers good living conditions, such as a mild climate, water, fertile farmland and hunting grounds. Finds from this period come from the area of Korinos, Ritini, Pigi Athinas and Makrygialos. Remains of settlements have been scarcely excavated, but found graves with various grave goods: stone and earthen figures, clay vessels, tools made of bone and stone, flint arrowheads and pieces of jewellery, which were made of bone or clay.

=== Bronze Age, ca. 3000 to 1000 BC ===
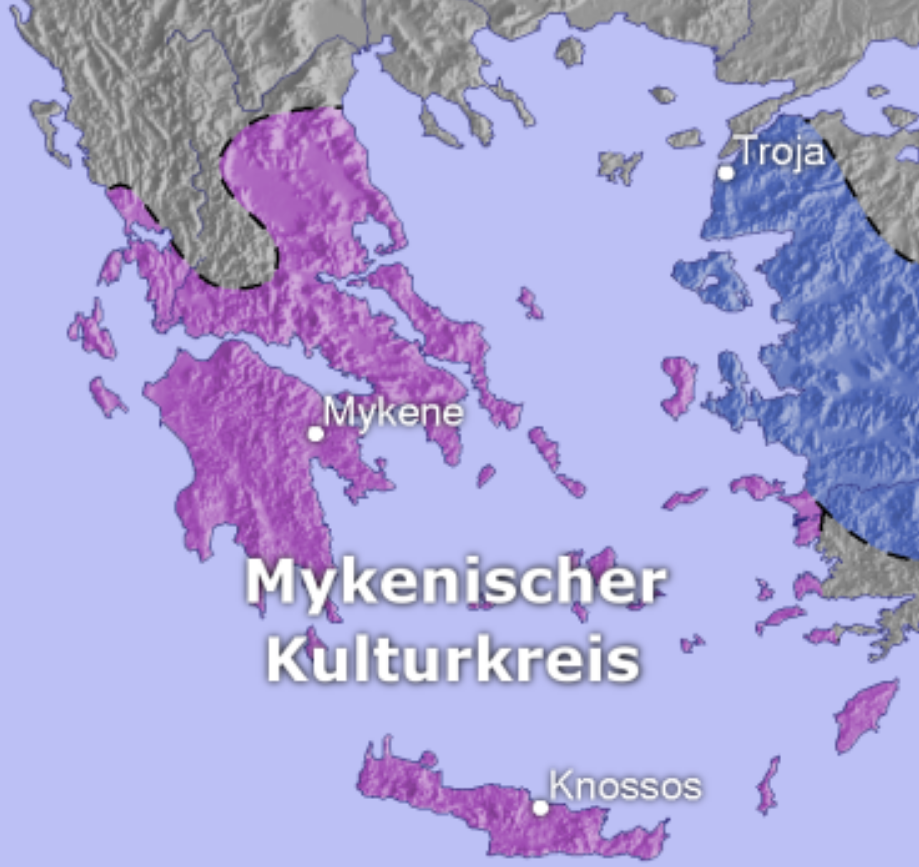
Extension of the Mycenaean culture (ca. 1400 BC.)

Settlement patterns shifted from the mountains towards the sea. Metalworking, shipping and trade brought prosperity to the region. The archaeological finds from this era are, inter alia, from Platamonas (the ancient Heraklion), Aiginio, Ancient Methone, Ancient Pydna, Pigi Artemidos, Trimbina, Kitros (Louloudies) and Korinos.

In addition to individual tombs, necropolises and settlements were discovered. The finds from this period include clay pottery and in the earth embedded earthen storage vessels, also metal tools and weapons, and jewelry made of gold, silver, bronze and glass.

==== Mycenaean period ====
The end of the Bronze Age is referred to as Mycenaean period in southern Greece and Crete, as these areas were under the cultural influence of Mycenae. During this time not only Mycenaean goods were traded in the Mediterranean, but also adopted Mycenaean culture and customs. Mycenaean graves and earthenware have survived from this period, the latter being very helpful in dating archeological findings. The northern limit of the spread of the Mycenaean culture is in Pieria, further north, no signs have been discovered.

=== Iron Age, ca. 1000 to 700 BC ===
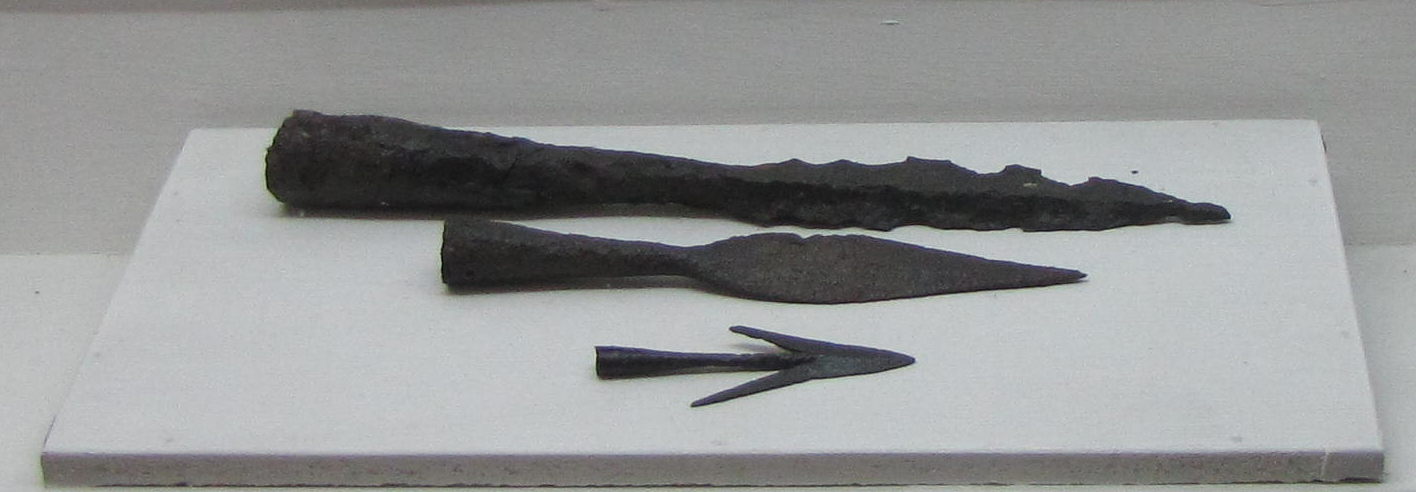
Parts of weapons, Iron Age

- From Corfu displaced settlers, who originally came from Eretria (Euboea), settled in the second half of the 8th century BC in Methone.
- Around 800 BC, Leivithra was settled.
- In Methone the Greek script was used.

The coastal population grew, with some Bronze Age settlements seemingly abandoned. Pieria was more populated by places that offered natural protection (e.g. Sfendani, Kouko or Livadi), existing settlements were fortified (the ancient Methone with a three-meter-high wall). Trade relations were expanded and the Phoenician alphabet introduced and modified for the Greek language.

Finds from this period are in addition to jewelry, pottery, weapons and tools also remains of wooden grave borders.

=== Archaic and Classical Greek period, ca. 700 BC to 323 BC ===
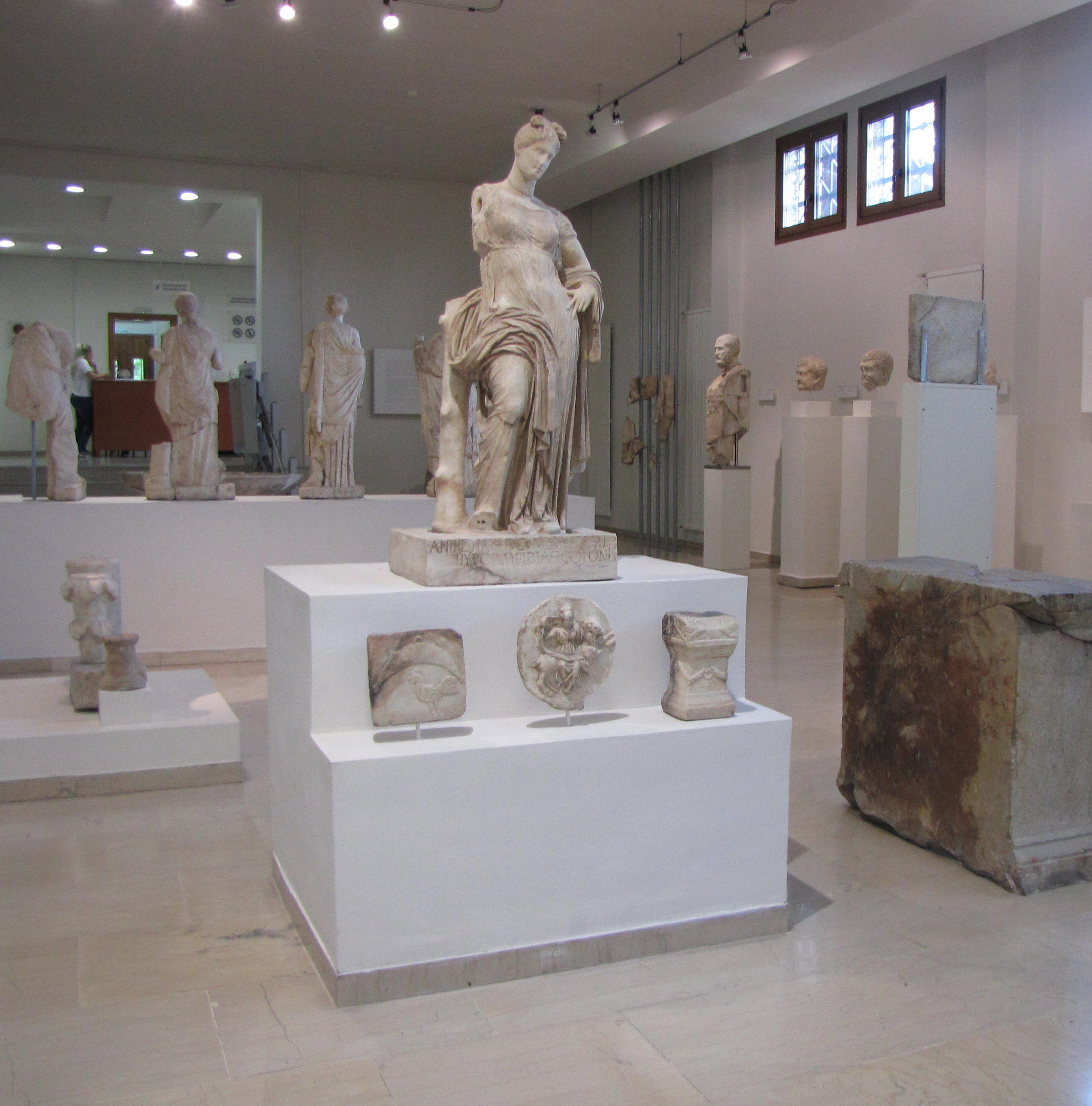
Archaeological museum, Dion

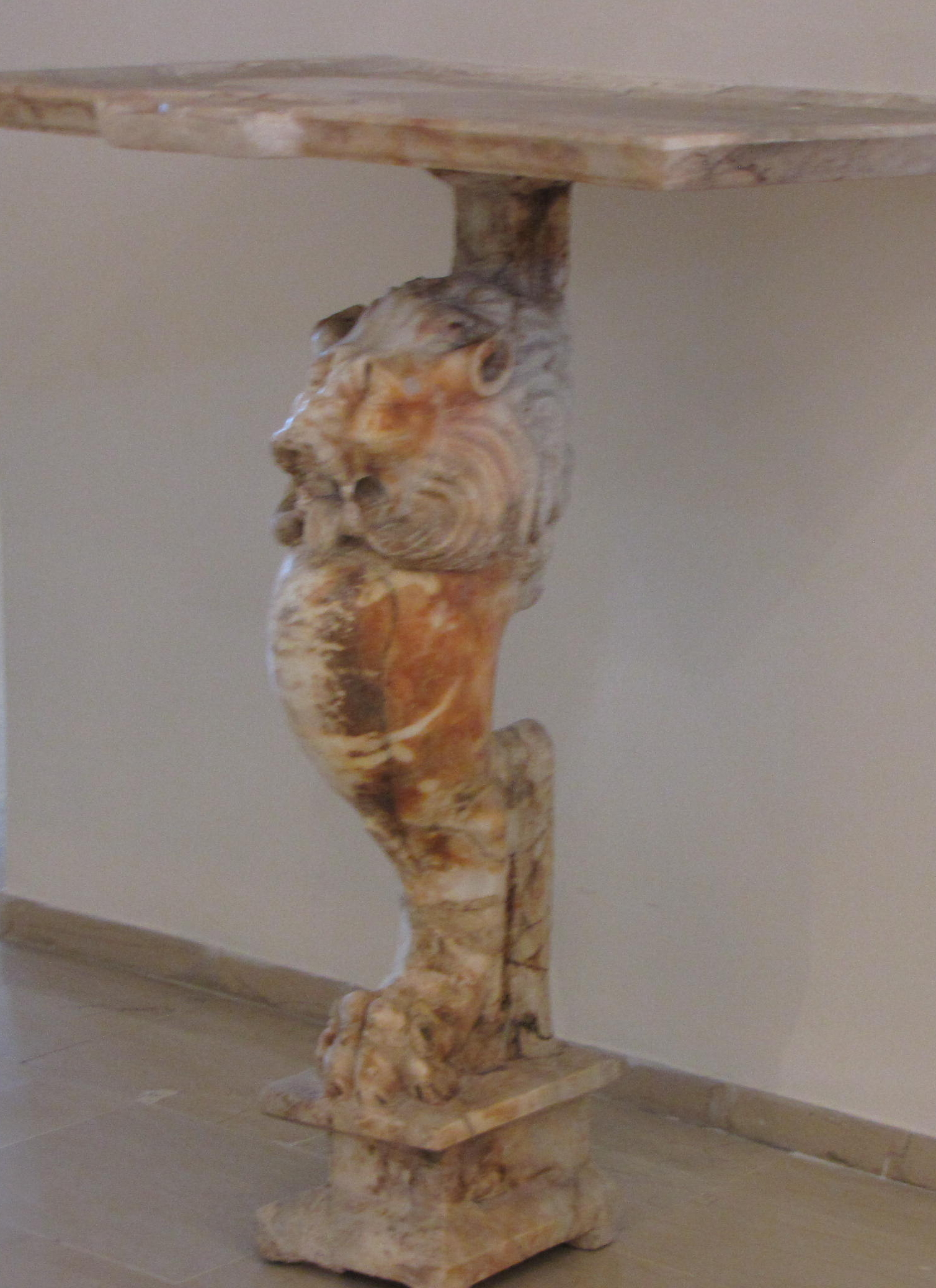
Marbletable at the Archaeological museum, Dion

- Around 700 BC, the Macedonian Kingdom was founded.
- In the first half of the 5th century BC Alexander I of Macedon introduced coinage in the Macedonian Kingdom.
- 432 BC Pydna was besieged by the Athenians.
- Around 424 BC Thucydides first mentioned the existence of Dion.
- After the capture of Pydna by King Archelaus, 410 BC, he relocated the city from the shore to the interior.
- At the end of the 5th century BC, Archelaus relocated the capital of the kingdom of Aegae (now Vergina) to Pella. He introduced the Olympic Games in Dion, a nine-day festival in honor of the nine Muses.
- In the 2nd quarter of the 4th century BC, the Macedonian tombs of Katerini were built. The discovery of a coin from the time of Amyntas III underpins this dating.
- In the late 4th century BC the Macedonian tombs of Korinos were built. They were used until the beginning of the 3rd century BC.
- In the year 356 BC Alexander the Great was born.
- 354 BC Philip II besieged and conquered Methone.
- Before his campaign against the Persians, Alexander the Great sacrificed to the gods in Dion.
- After the Battle of Granikos (334 BC), Alexander commissioned the respected sculptor Lysippus to build 25 bronze statues of the horsemen killed in the Battle of Granikos and placed them in the Zeus Olympios Sanctuary in Dion.

=== Hellenistic period, ca. 323 BC to 146 BC ===
- 323 BC Death of Alexander the Great.
- 219 BC Dion was destroyed by the Aetolian League. Philip V of Macedon had the city rebuilt.
- 169 BC The Romans moved to their camp in the plain between Heraklion (today Platamonas) and Leivithra.
- 168 BC the Macedonian king Perseus was defeated in the Battle of Pydna by the Roman army commander Lucius Aemilius Paullus. Macedonia is divided by the Romans into four regions, the Macedonian elite being expelled from the country.
- 148 BC Andriscus, with the help of an army of Thracians and the support of the native population, tried to free Macedonia from the Romans, but was defeated by the Romans under the command of Metellus. Then the Romans founded their first province in the east, with Thessaloniki as its capital.

=== Roman period, ca. 146 BC to 330 AD ===
- Around 100 BC Leivithra was destroyed by a natural disaster and abandoned by its inhabitants.
- Approximately 150 to 200 AD, a temple dedicated to Dionysus was built in Dion.
- In 212 AD, the Constitutio Antoniniana granted Roman citizenship to all inhabitants of the Empire.
- In 285 AD, the Roman Empire was divided in the western Roman and the Eastern Roman Empire.
- When Dion became a Roman province, at Juli 7 the Nonae Capratinae were celebrated. Female slaves enjoyed certain freedoms at this festival. There was a connection between the worship of Zeus Hypsistos and the Nonae Capratinae, probably in honor of Jupiter Capitolinus, the Jupiter Optimus Maximus.

The archaeological finds from the over 1000-year period from the end of the Iron Age to the end of the Roman rule over Pieria are very extensive. Dion is the leading archaeological site here, the ownership issues are clarified there, the archaeologists can work freely in a large area. Elsewhere, such as in Methone, land under which antiquities are suspected is privately owned. Methone benefited from several years of collaboration with the University of California, Los Angeles (UCLA); this gave valuable insights into the beginnings of the Greek alphabet. In Leivithra and Pydna, which could easily be excavated, the Greek state is currently lacking funds (May 2018).

The finds are either displayed in museums or they are stored. Fully equipped is the archaeological museum at Dion, at the Leivithra Park only replicas are exhibited, the recent finds from Leivithra are stored at the Archaeological museum of Dion. In the archaeological museum of Makrygialos smaller artefacts and earthen vessels are exhibited; the museum is not yet open to the public (as of May 2018).

Coins, jewelry, earthen and glass vessels, weapons, tools, building materials, sarcophagi, grave steles, statues, statuettes, well enclosures, mosaics, a water organ and many other pieces were discovered.

=== Byzantine period, ca. 330 to 1453 AD ===
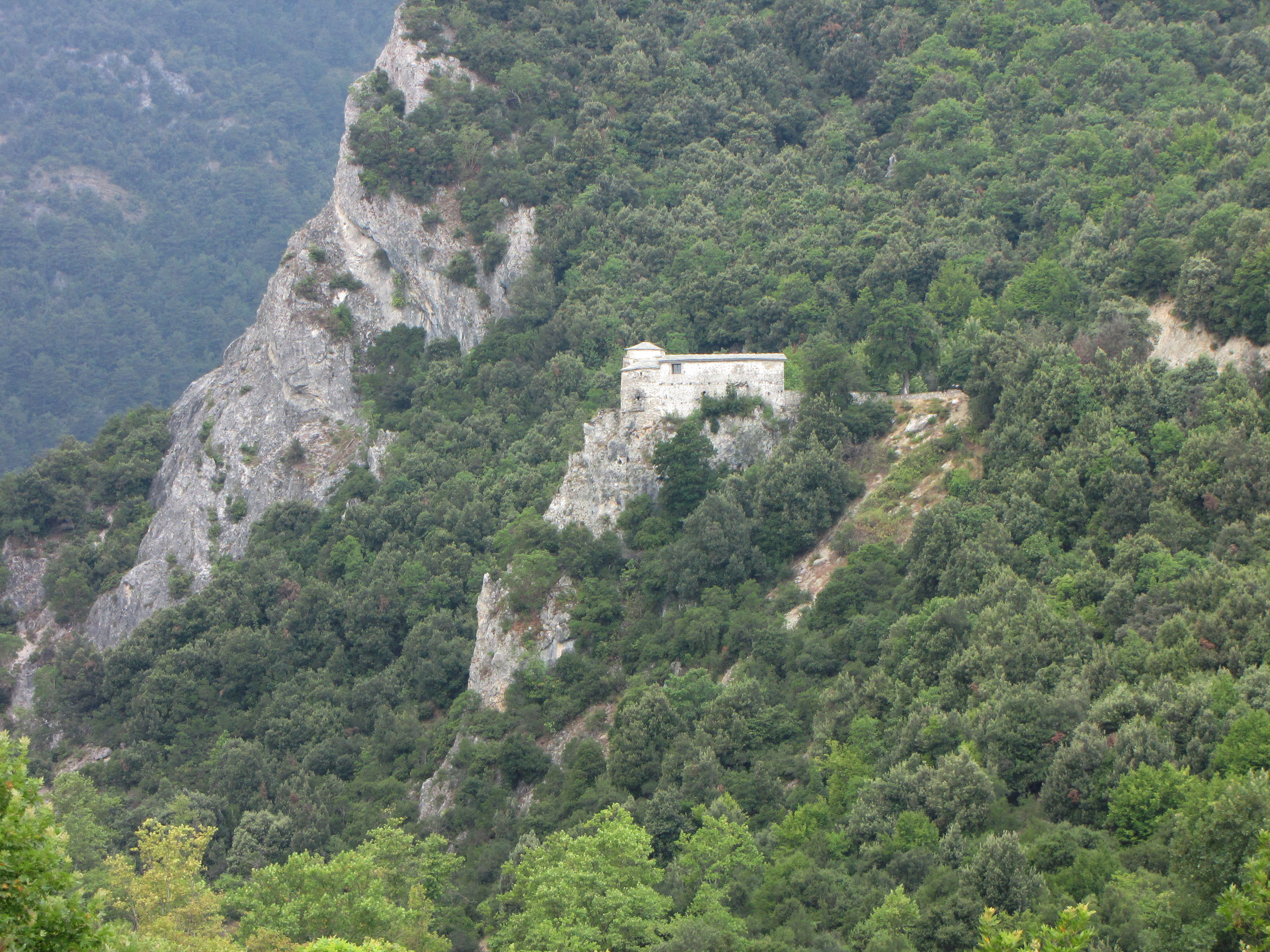
Church Agia Triada, Vrondou

- 343 Dion was appointed a bishopric; In two stages of construction, the basilica of the bishop was built in the 4th and 5th centuries.
- In the last quarter of the 5th century Louloudies, located near the ancient Pydna, was expanded to an episcopal seat.
- Dion is last mentioned in the 10th century as an administrative district of Byzantine Emperor Constantine VII Porphyrogennetos.
- In 1055 the Kanalon monastery was founded. The French archaeologist Heuzey dated the founding to the year 955.
- In the 12th century, the name Heraklion was replaced by Platamon.
- In 1204 Frankish knights founded the Kingdom of Thessalonica following the Fourth Crusade.
- Foundation of the monastery Agia Triada, Sparmos; records show that the monastery was inhabited since at least the year 1386. The exact date of foundation is not known, the monastery can be quite older.

Important archaeological sites of the Byzantine period are the castle of Platamon, Louloudies and the castle of Pydna, built by Frankish knights over the ruins of the ancient city. From Byzantine times come the inhabited monasteries Kanalon and Agia Triada, Sparmos. Furthermore, there are numerous churches of this period, such as the Holy Trinity (Agia Triada), located above Vrondou, and the Church of the Assumption at Kontariotissa.

Significant archaeological finds from this period are mainly of ecclesiastical origin. They are exhibited in the archaeological museum of Dion or in the museums of the monasteries.

== Ancient sites ==
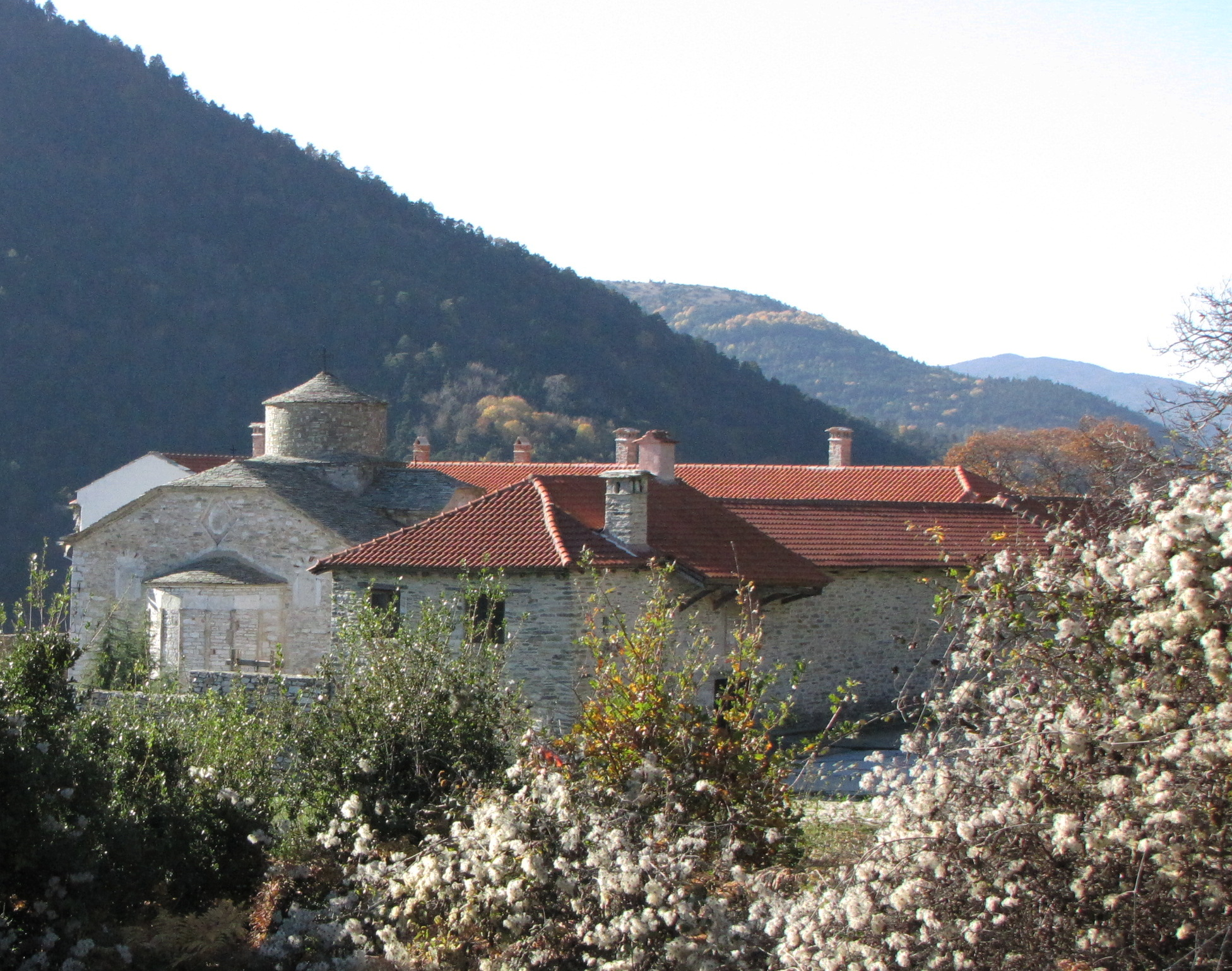
Monastery Kanalon

- Aiginio
- Aiginio - Melissia
- Alykes Kitrous
- Ancient Methone
- Ancient Pydna
- Necropolises of Pydna
- Kastania Kolindros
- Macedonian tombs, Katerini
- Kitros
- Kompoloi
- Korinos
- Macedonian tombs, Korinos
- Krania
- Leivithra
- Louloudies
- Makrygialos
- Nea Agathoupoli
- Pieriki Endochora
- Pigi Artemidos
- Pigi Athinas
- Platamon Castle
- Platamon Stop
- Ritini
- Sevasti
- Spathes
- Tria Platania
- Treis Elies
- Valtos Leptokaryas
- Xerolakki
- Xydias

== Literature ==
- Dimitrios Pandermalis: Dion. The archaeological site and the museum. Athens 1997.
- Hellenic Republic, Ministry of Culture and Sports, Onassis Foundation USA: Gods and Mortals at Olympus. Dimitrios Pandermalis, ISBN 978-0-9906142-2-7.
- Besios, Matheos. Pieridon Stefanos: Pydna, Methone and the ancient sites of northern Pieria (Πιερίδων Στέφανος: Πύδνα, Μεθώνη και οι αρχαιότητες της βόρειας Πιερίας. Α’ Έκδοση: Κατερίνη 2010), ISBN 978-960-99308-0-2, (in Greek).
- Efi Poulaki-Pantermali: Makedonikos Olympos. Mythos – Istoria – Archäologia., Greek ministry for culture and sport, Thessaloniki 2013, ISBN 978-960-386-110-2 (in Greek).
