= Necropolises of Pydna =

Set of Macedonian tombs in present-day Greece

- Location within Greece
- 40.400509°N 22.613732°E
- Periods: Bronze Age — Christian Era
- Location: Pieria, Greece

There are some Macedonian tombs and the necropolises of Pydna around ancient Pydna and beside the ancient road from Methone in the north to Dion in the south. The oldest tombs are from the Bronze Age; the youngest are from the early Christian period. Smaller tumuli have eroded over time and are no longer visible. Most excavations have had to be carried out to save the sites. The finds in both areas show a shrinking population during the second Greek colonization.

== Locations ==
Numerous tombs from different periods have been discovered around the ancient city. An extensive northern necropolis and smaller necropolises are in the west and south (40.380732°N 22.618475°E), as well as individual graves and burial mounds. Ancient customs required cemeteries to be placed by access roads and near city gates.

== Graves ==
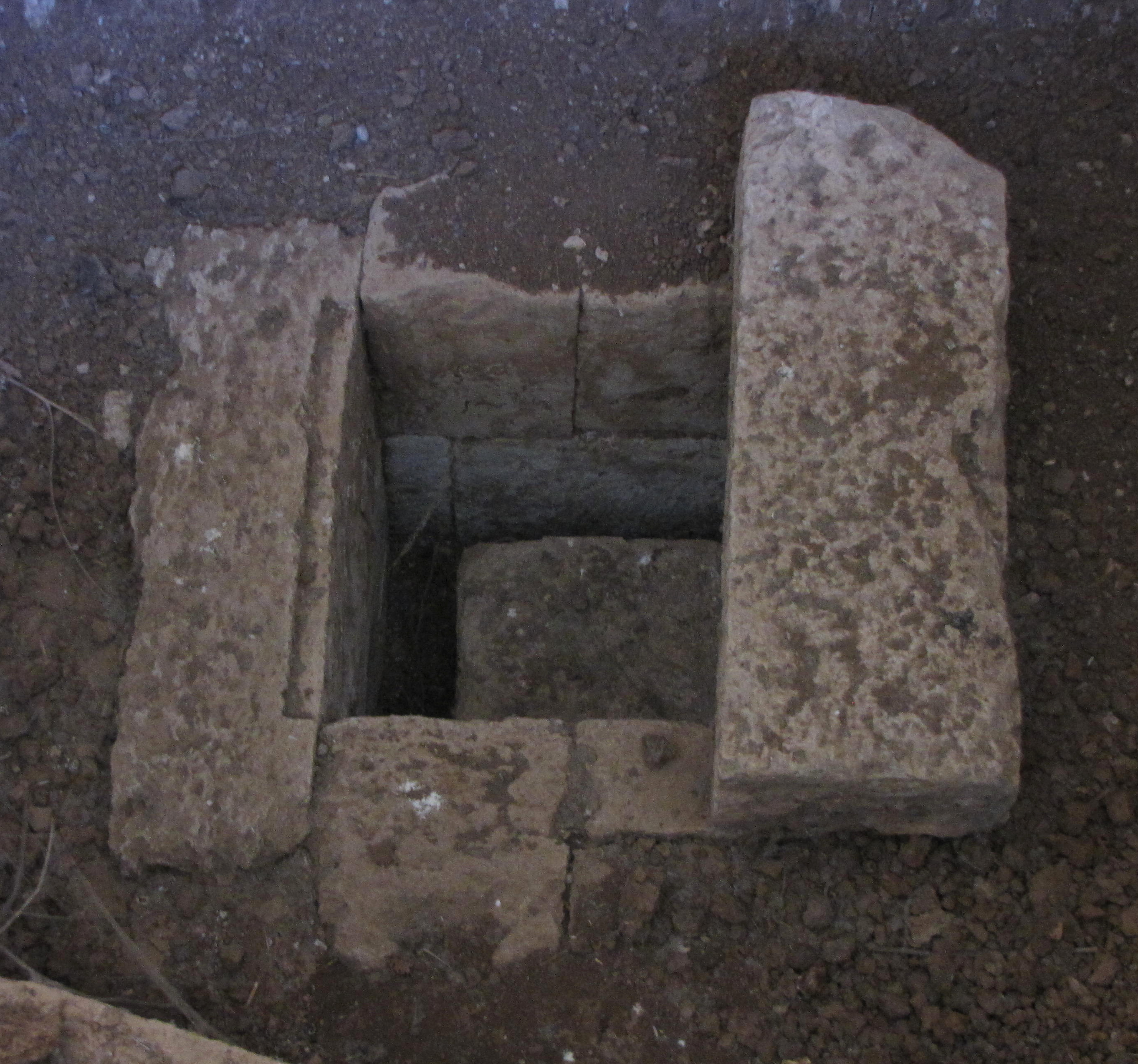
Pydna, square grave

Among the necropolises, changes in style and funeral rites can be observed over centuries, and different types of burials can be seen among the graves. In a few cases, bodies were cremated, but most were buried. Toddlers were often buried in common clay pots, which were broken up and, after embedding the body, rejoined. In some cases, cremated bodies were also buried in copper kettles or clay pots. The dead were either burned directly in the grave or a wooden platform was built for this purpose. During the 5th century BC, male corpses were buried head-west, female bodies head-east. In the skulls of many deceased, the so-called Charon's obol was found, placed under the tongues of the dead to pay the ferryman Charon for transferring the soul to Hades. During the Hellenistic and Roman periods, burials were the rule, and cremations were even rarer than in the Classical period. Remains of wooden coffins indicate that they were painted in blue and red. Graves from the mid-4th century BC are smaller than those created before or after, which archaeologists attribute to hard economic times.

The form of the graves goes from a simple pit over enclosed graves to Macedonian and Thracian tombs with dromos and several chambers. In part, the patterns of the arrangement of graves suggest their use as family tombs. The most elaborate design embodies the monumental Macedonian tombs, the two most significant of which are located in Korinos. The soils of the simple graves were sprinkled with gravel or sand. Stone slabs or, more often - as stones are rare in the environs of Pydna - wooden boards covered the graves. Single square tombs testify that the remains of the deceased were reburied later. Six of the discovered tombs were built in the Mycenaean style, which was unusual in Pieria.

== Burial objects ==
Many objects have been found within the graves. In addition to pottery, jewelry, weapons, and tools, richly decorated glass vessels have been uncovered. The clay vessels were mainly imported from Attica, in rarer cases also from Corinth or other places around the Aegean; some are also from local production. In children's graves, clay figures have often been found. The pieces of jewelry are usually made of bronze, iron, or silver; less often, they are made of bone or gold. In the graves of the male deceased, weapons have been found only in rare cases. The small vessels of glass or alabaster, which are attached to the corpses of women, are usually in good condition. Some of the finds are exhibited in the archaeological museum in Makrygialos, the largest part being stored in the Archaeological Museum of Thessaloniki.

=== Northern necropolis ===
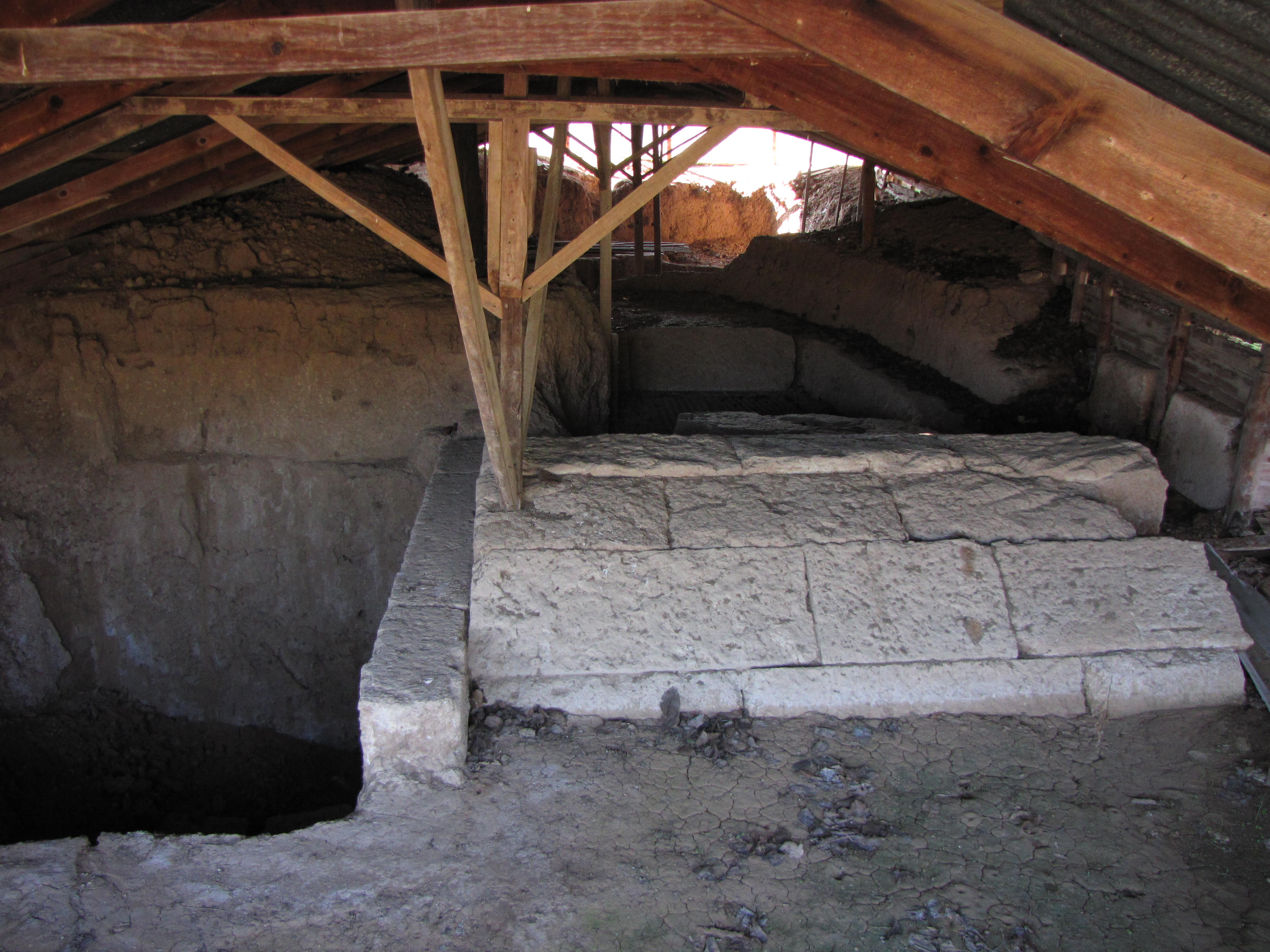
Macedonian tombs south of Makrygialos

Located at the juncture of three ancient roads, some 3,000 graves from the Classical and Hellenistic periods have been discovered. This is the largest and most intensively used burial ground. The youngest graves are used until the year 146 BC. Since the graves are mainly in agricultural areas, they were mapped, photographed, and after the grave goods were removed, filled with soil again. The vast part of the northern necropolis still remains uncovered and the land is currently used by farmers to grow crops. Only monumental individual graves are still open, protected against weather by roofs.

The simple graves were mostly untouched when archaeologists found them, in contrast to the Macedonian burial mounds, which were often already looted during antiquity.

A burial mound some 500 meters north of the ramparts of ancient Pydna contained tombs from the 5th and 4th centuries BC. Most of them were spared by grave robbers. Within the graves were rich grave goods; the women had been given valuable glass vessels and gold and silver jewelry; in the men's graves were swords, lances, helmets, and drinking vessels.

=== Southern necropolis ===
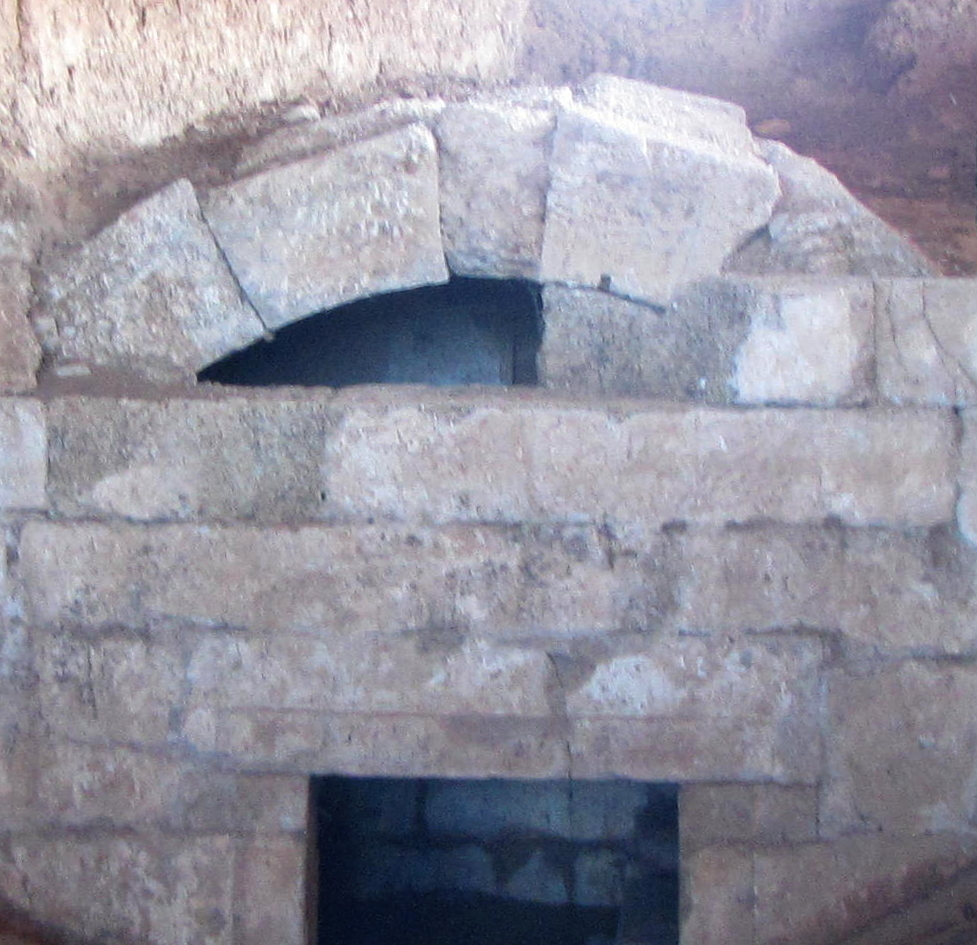
Pydna, southern necropolis

Near the salt mines of Kitros lie the graves of the southern necropolis of Pydna. It is much smaller than the northern cemetery, but the tombs are more magnificent. Archaeologists assume that the wealthier inhabitants of Pydna were buried here. The excavations began in 1984 and were stopped in 2003 after several breaks. To date, 83 graves have been uncovered, but they form only a part of the southern necropolis. The oldest graves date back to 350 BC, and the last burial places are dated to 146 BC. They thus represent the largest period of burial culture from the ascent to the fall of the Macedonian kingdom.

The graves can be dated in three phases:

- From 350 BC until the first years of the reign of King Antigonus Gonatas (276-239 BC). The largest and the most magnificent of the tombs date from this period. They were used partly (probably by families) for decades.
- From the beginning of the 3rd century BC, Macedonian unicameral tombs were preferred, and in some cases included several people. This type lasted until the first half of the 2nd century BC.
- From the second half of the 2nd century BC, single graves predominated again.

Most of the graves were still untouched, and inside the looted graves, non-metallic objects remained; the grave robbers were obviously only interested in precious metals (possibly also in weapons). Noteworthy is the grave of a physician, whose grave goods were his medical instruments.
