= Ancient Pydna =

Ancient Greek city in Pieria, Central Macedonia, Greece

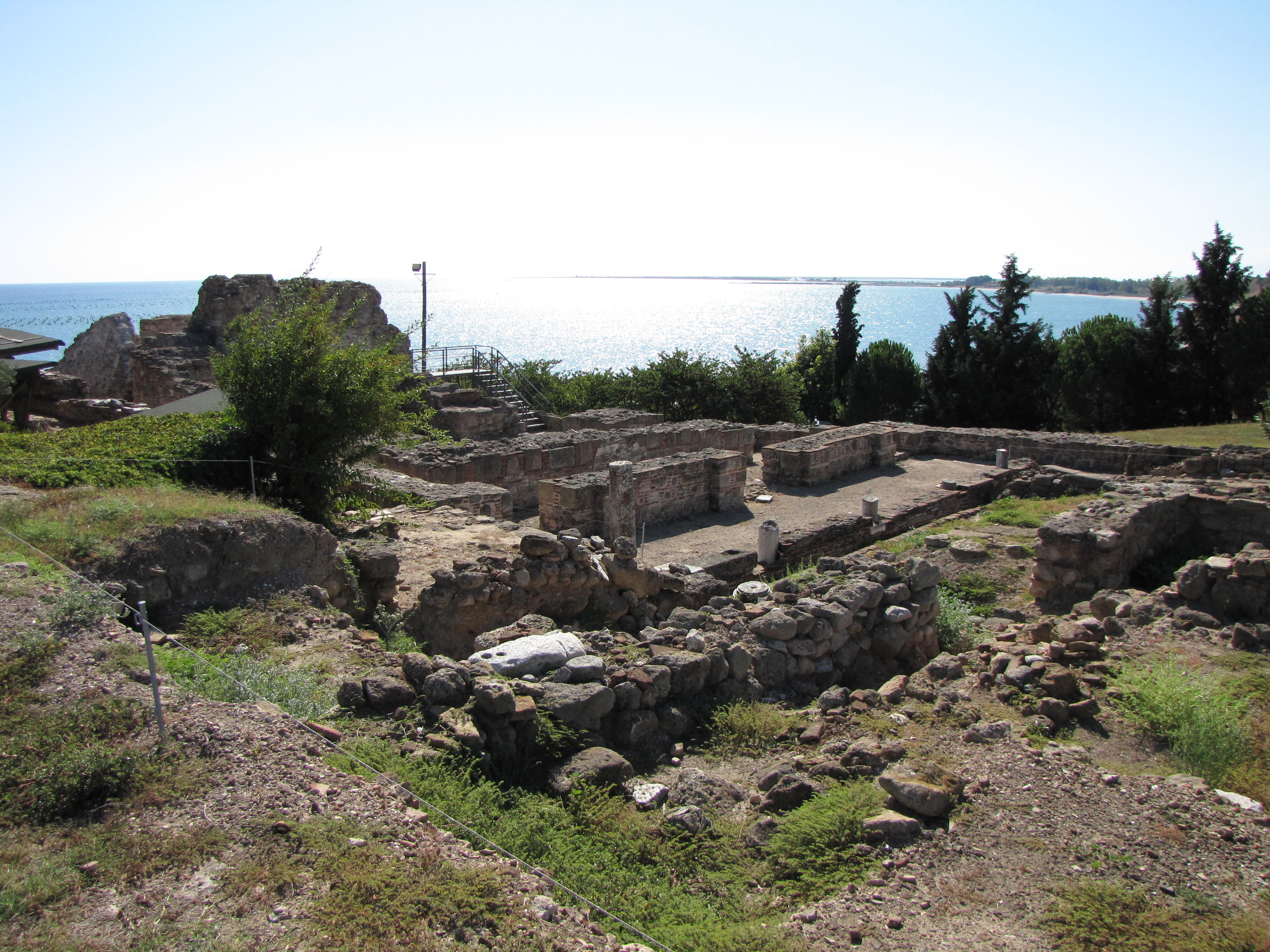
- Pydna, the ancient site
- Interactive map of Ancient Pydna
- 40.397465°N 22.617359°E
- Location: Pieria, Central Macedonia, Greece

Pydna (Greek: Πύδνα) was an ancient Greek city in what is now the regional unit of Pieria, Central Macedonia, Greece. It is an important place in the history of Pieria and a major archaeological site located directly at the Aegean Sea, 16 km northeast of Katerini, 28 km north-east of Dion and 2.5 km from the village of Makrygialos. Nearby are two Macedonian tombs, discovered by the French archaeologist Heuzey during his Greek travels in the mid-19th century. Furthermore, the fortress-like bishop's seat Louloudies is located a few kilometers south of Pydna.

== History ==
=== Prehistoric Pydna ===
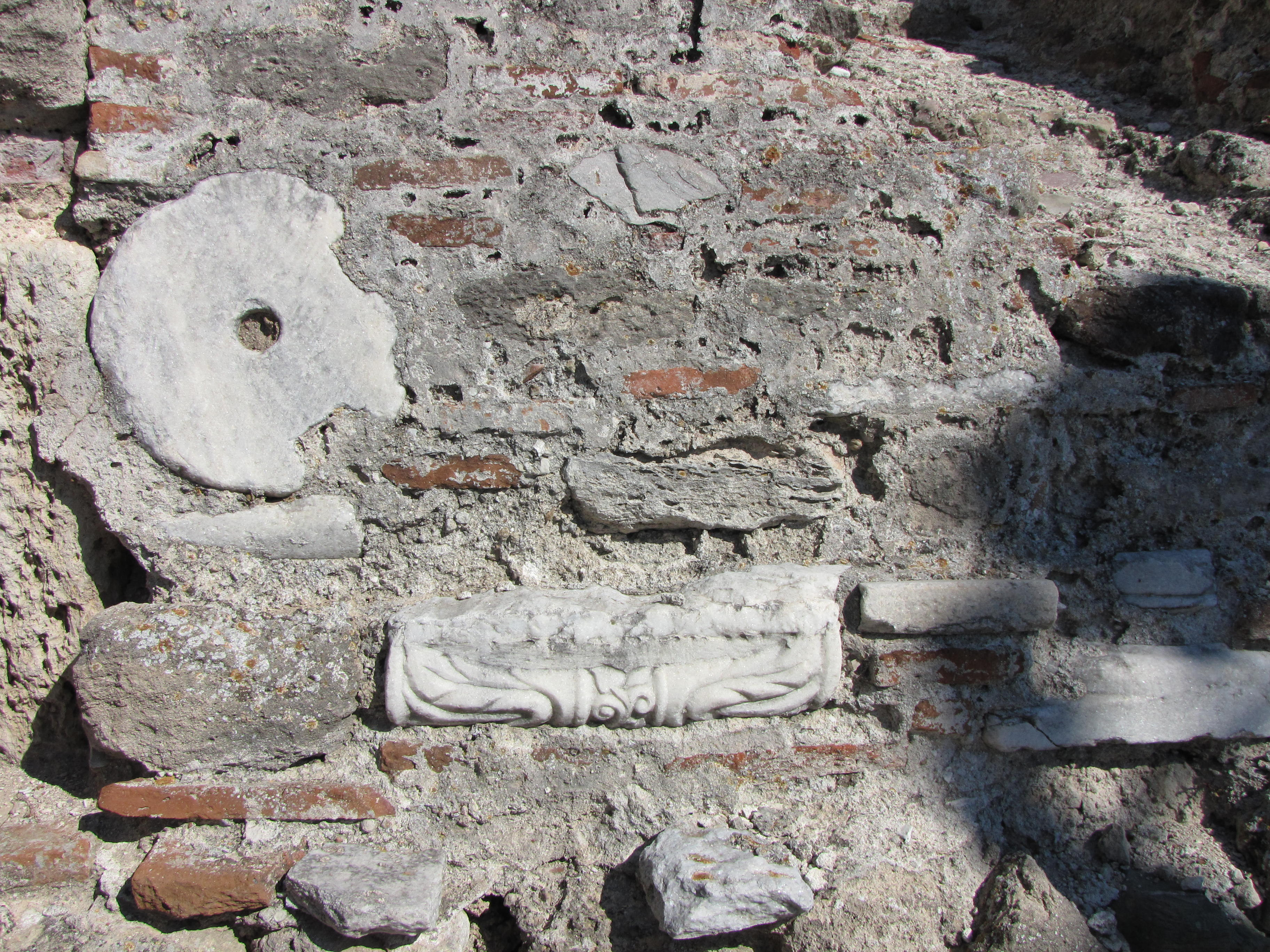
Pydna, part of the wall

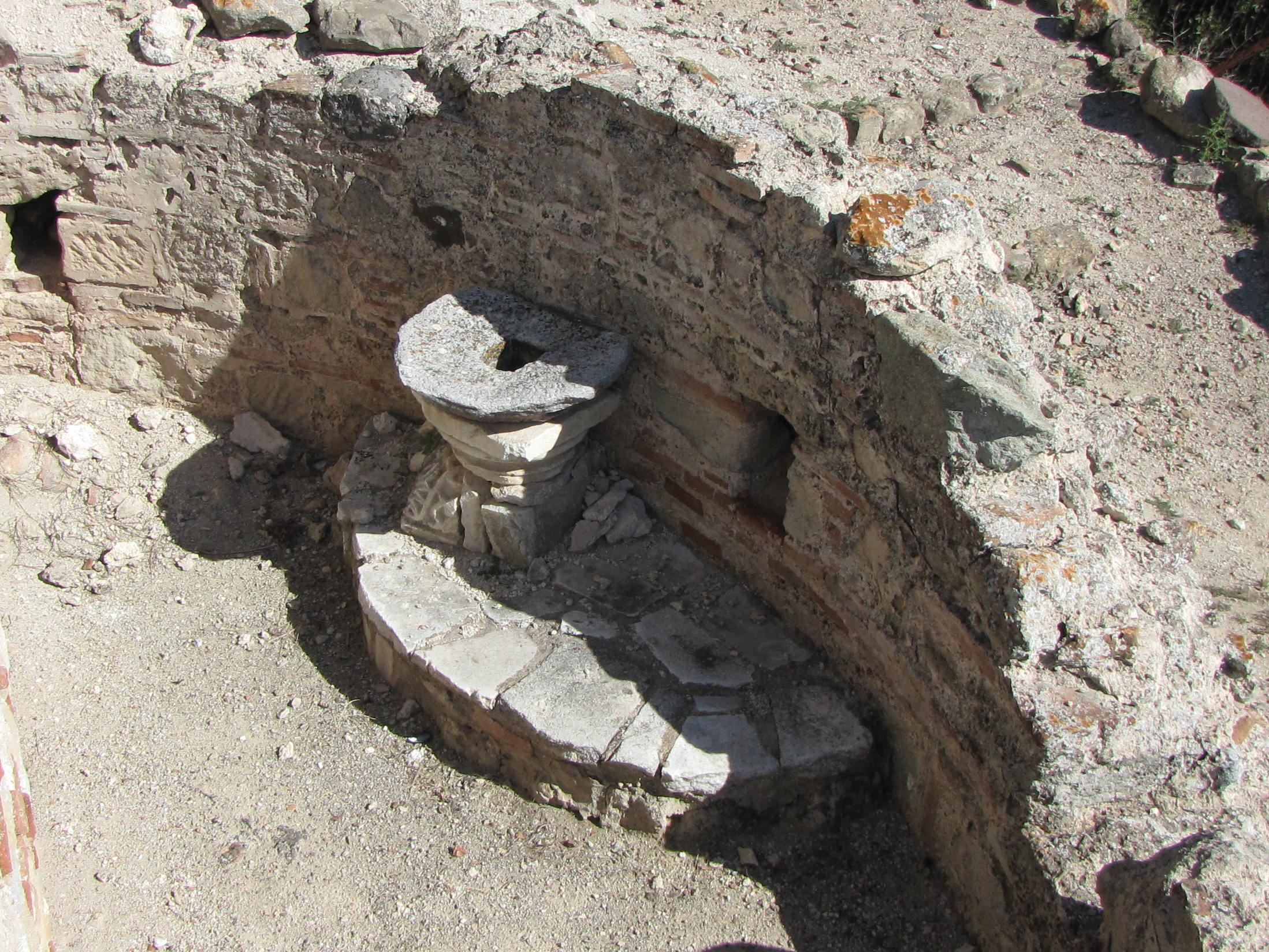
Pydna, Fryktoria

Even from Mycenaean times (1400 BC) settlements were found in the hills north of the excavation site. From 1000 to about 600 BC the area was inhabited by Thracians. The eastern part of the settlement has slipped into the sea; the western half is preserved, but has not yet been excavated.

=== Classical Pydna ===
Pydna was already a part of the Macedonian kingdom under Alexander I; first mentioned by the Greek historian Thucydides, it gained importance during the Peloponnesian War. The Athenians unsuccessfully besieged Pydna in 432 BC. After seceding from Macedonian rule it was again besieged in 410 BC by King Archelaus I of Macedonia, who guarded the land side while an allied Athenian fleet guarded the sea. After the city was taken, Archelaus moved its population to a new site 20 stadia farther inland, the present location of Kitros. The inhabitants of Pydna moved back to their old seaside site after Archelaus's death in the early 4th century. The Athenians, under Timotheus, seized Pydna in 364-363 BC, only to have it retaken in 357 BC by Philip II of Macedon, the father of Alexander the Great. Thereafter the city remained part of the kingdom of Macedonia until the Roman conquest. Olympias, wife of Philip II and mother of Alexander, fled to Pydna in 317 BC, having incurred Cassander's wrath by scheming against Phillip III and his wife. After a siege, Cassander captured the city and killed Olympias in the spring of 316 BC.

Parts of the city wall, built in the 5th century BC, are located 500 m north of the ancient site. The exact course of the city wall is unknown. In excavation work, only parts have been discovered so far. The wall was not made of stone but of clay. It was destroyed after the city was taken by Philip II.

Pydna issued its own coins for the first time in the late 6th century BC. Further coins were found dating from between 389 and 379 BC.

=== Roman Pydna ===
On 22 June 168 BC, Perseus, the last Macedonian king, lost the Battle of Pydna to the Roman commander Aemilius Paullus, who afterwards took the epithet "Macedonicus". This battle ended the reign of the Antigonid dynasty over Macedonia, and Pydna subsequently became a Roman colony.

=== Christian Pydna ===
The Christianization of Pydna began in the fourth century. At this time the first basilica was built. At the beginning of the 6th century a second basilica was built. Both basilicas were dedicated to the patron of the city, St. Alexander. The second basilica was burnt down after an attack by the Bulgarians. At the end of the 10th century a much larger basilica was built in its place. It measured 23.20 m by 16.60 m. It was decorated with frescoes and the floor was laid out with mosaic. During the Franconian period, the basilica was expanded into a fortress. A well was drilled and supplies were laid. Inside the basilica is a 22 meter deep well with a stone fountain. Next to the well there was a cistern. A subterranean corridor was dug, which was to allow the crew of the castle to escape outside.

In the apse, facing the sea, there was a Fryktoria, to exchange light signals with the opposite Chalkidiki peninsula. In this way, light signals were transmitted to larger distances by means of torches, and messages could be transmitted within a short time over hundreds of kilometers.

Spolias (remains and fragments of columns and other masonry work) were incorporated into the surrounding wall. The wall was built in two phases. In the 6th century, during the time of Justinian, the first construction phase took place. In the 10th century the wall was reinforced and some of the gates were walled up. The wall is about 1.40 m thick and was reinforced by rectangular towers. Some of the remains of the complex date from the 16th century, the time of the occupation of Greece by the Ottomans.

West of the road, which formerly connected Pydna with Dion, are remains of the city walls and a city gate to be seen. The current course of the road is largely identical to that of the ancient road.

Late in the first millennium of the Christian era Pydna became a bishopric under the name Kitros or Citrus. It is included in the Notitia Episcopatuum of Leo VI the Wise (866–912). Its bishop Germanus participated in the Photian Council of Constantinople (879). In the aftermath of the Fourth Crusade Citrus became a Latin Church diocese, as witnessed by a letter of Pope Innocent III in 1208, which does not give the name of the bishop of the see. It is now listed by the Catholic Church as a titular see.

=== Medieval Pydna ===
Between the 6th and 7th century AD, Pydna was named Kitros, and was the most important town of Pieria until the 14th century. In the 11th and 12th centuries Kitros was the seat of a Katepanikion.

In 1204 Kitros, after a siege, was taken by the Franks. They turned the bishop's church into a castle and built a tower in which their commander-in-chief resided.

In the 14th century the inhabitants left the village and settled in today's Kitros, in the inland of the country.

== Archaeology ==
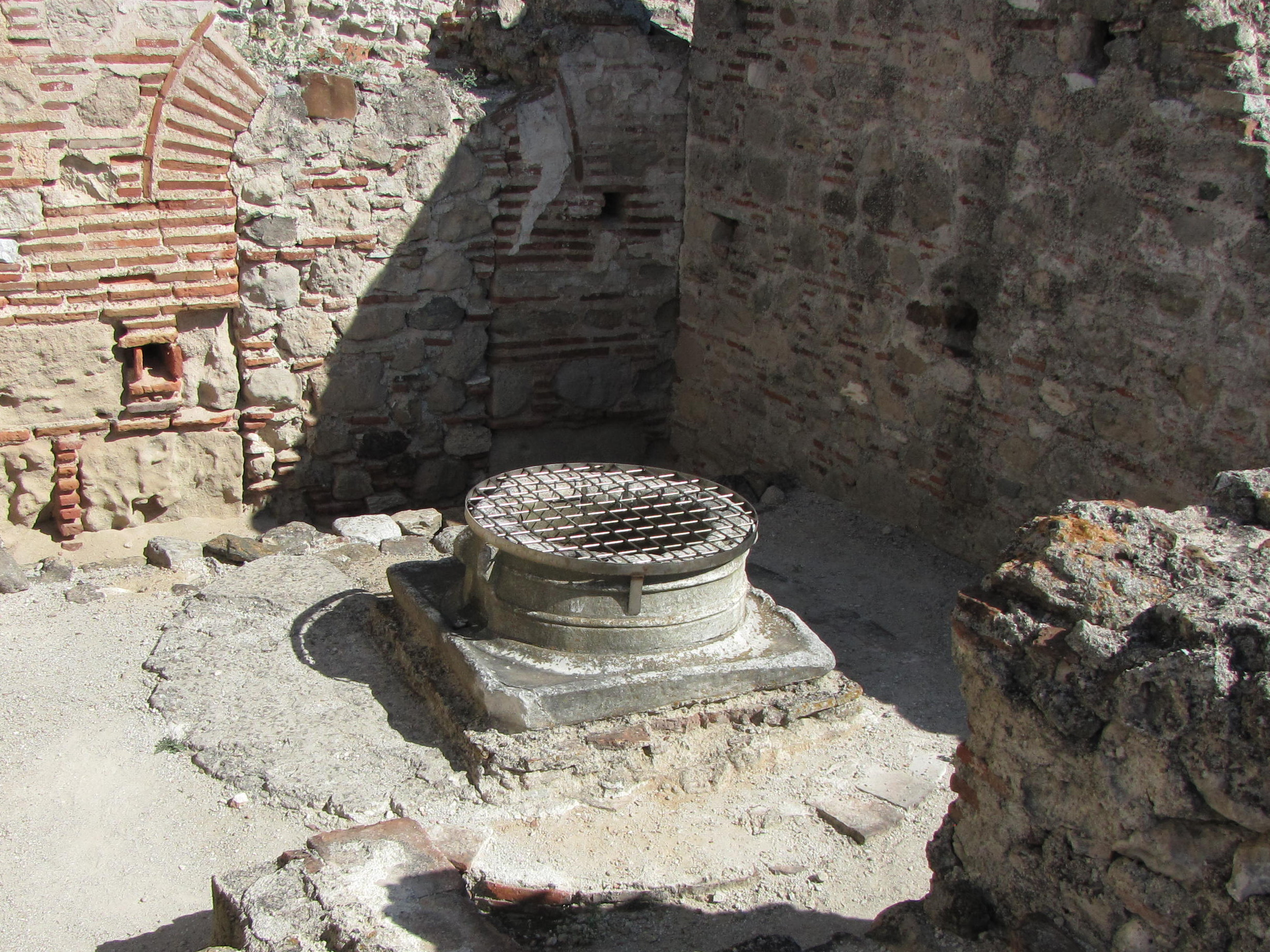
Pydna, the well

At the site of the ancient Pydna, the visible buildings are from the Byzantine era. The remains of the ancient Polis from the Classical, Hellenistic and, possibly, pre-Greek period are lying, at least partly, under the Byzantine buildings. The entire complex measures 320 m by 130 m.

So far, the surrounding necropolis have been released. They have a considerable size. The northern necropolis contains more than 3300 graves. They date from the late Bronze Age, around 1400 BC, Until the time of Hellenisticism, at the beginning of the 3rd century BC. These are very large pits, in which numerous excavations were found. Many of them are kept in the archaeological museum in Thessaloniki. Two other necropolises are located in the west and south of Pydna. The Western was founded at the time of the classical period, in the 5th century BC, and was used until the Hellenistic period. The southern graying site dates from Hellenistic times and was cultivated until the Roman period. The size of the tombs and the valuable burial gifts indicate that more prosperous people were buried here. The southern and western necropolis are not archaeologically explored as well as the northern ones.

Near the harbor a kiln for pottery and a guest house with bathroom was excavated.

== See also ==
- Pydna curse tablets
- Pydna-Kolindros
- List of ancient Greek cities

== Bibliography ==
- Matheos Besios: "Pieridon Stefanos: Pydna, Methoni kai archaeotites tis voria Pierias" (Πιερίδων Στεφανός: Πύδνα, Μεθώνη και οι αρχαιότητες της βόριας Πιερίας), ISBN 978-960-99308-0-2
- L. Heuzey & H. Daumet: Mission Archéologique de Macédoine (1876)
- Free Travel Guide about the Olympus region Title: Mount Olympus - Ancient Sites, Museums, Monasteries and Churches
