= Macedonian Tombs, Katerini =

4th c. BCE chamber tombs in Greece

Coordinates: 40.291014°N 22.533839°E

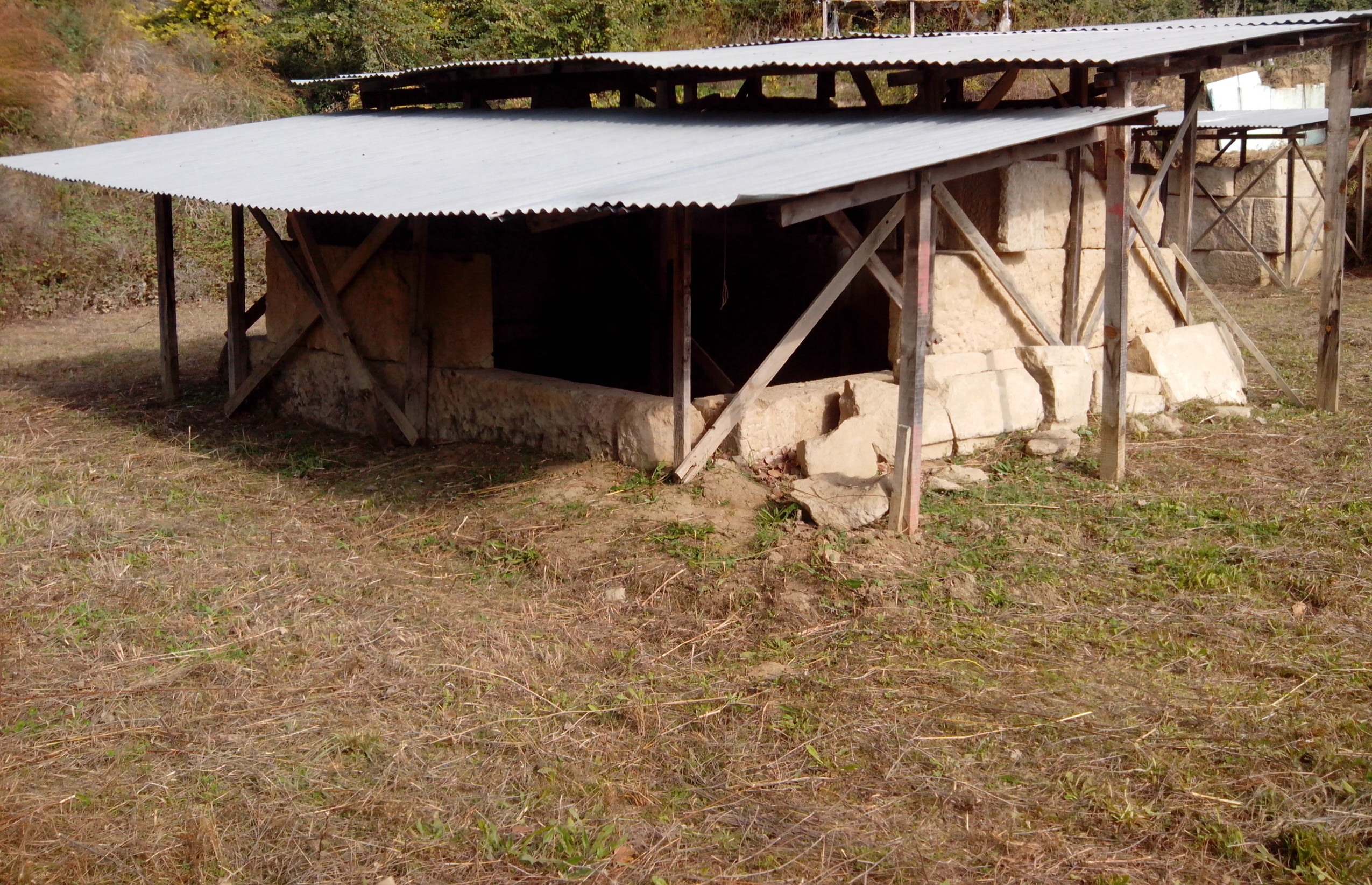
Macedonian Tombs, Katerini

At works to recover clay, two Macedonian tombs were discovered north of Katerini.

== Location ==
The graves are located approximately 3.7 km northeast of the center of Katerini between the National Road 1, the main connection Athens - Thessaloniki, and the Highway 1, immediately north of the junction Vória Kateríni (Katerini-North, Greek: Βόρεια Κατερίνη).

== Excavations ==
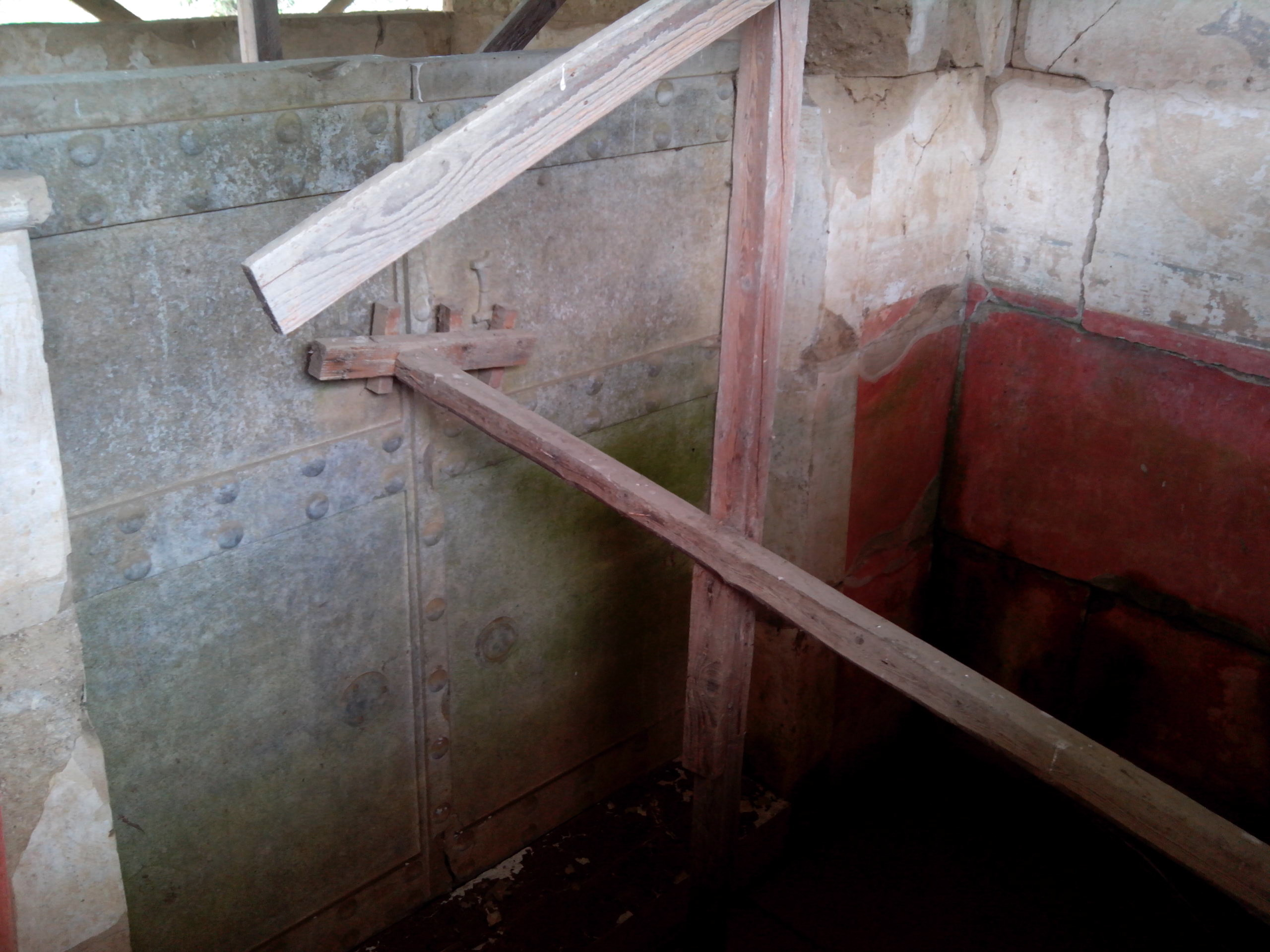
Macedonian Tombs, Katerini, Tomb A

Already in the late 1960s, a destroyed kiln and building remains had been discovered. Other structures were destroyed by dredging, while parts of a burial chamber were noticed. The tomb A is one of the earliest known examples of Macedonian tombs. Because of the design the grave is regarded as a transitional form from the cist graves to the Macedonian tombs. The excavations were carried out in May 1977. The discovery of a coin from the time Amyntas III allows dating of the tomb in the 2nd quarter of the 4th century BC. Both tombs were built from precisely manufactured limestone monoliths, plastered and painted inside. The graves were covered flat, they have neither access (Dromos) nor the usual vaulted ceiling. In both graves, the stone roof construction was partially removed, so that one has a good view from above. Access to the graves is not possible. A metal cover protects the structures from weathering.

=== Tomb A ===
The western grave has a pre-chamber and the actual burial chamber. The two chambers were separated by a double-winged marble door, which is completely preserved. The door was made, as in the neighboring Macedonian Tombs at Korinos, as a faux wooden door. Thus, iron bands and their attachment are mimicked. The floor is covered with stone slabs. The plaster of the interior walls is painted following the pattern of the smaller tomb. In the burial chamber are the remains of a stone couch (Kline), on which the deceased was buried.

To protect the marble doors from falling over, they are supported by wooden struts and metal bars.

=== Tomb B ===
The smaller, eastern grave is designed as a single-chamber grave. It was adorned by a two-tone painting. The plaster of the upper layer of the monolithic masonry is painted with yellow paint, the plaster of the underlying cuboid was decorated with red paint. The floor is laid out with stone plates.
