= Pigi Artemidos =

Coordinates: 39.9889°N 22.6076°E

Pigi Artemidos is a Bronze Age settlement.

== Discovery ==
During the construction of a national road to Thessaloniki, Pigi Artemidos (Greek: Πηγή Αρτέμιδος) was discovered. The area of the excavation is about 1,000 m^{2} (11,000 sq ft), it was dug to a depth of 2.50 meters (8 ft 2 in). The location was still in use in the classical period, possibly as a farm. Viticulture took place in the Roman period. The excavations lasted from July to December 2009.

== Location ==
Pigi Artemidos is located at the foot of the lower Olympus, between the Castle of Platamon and the source of Athena, west of the highway Athens - Thessaloniki at an altitude of 90 meters (300 ft).

== Necropolis ==
A 10-meter (33 ft) diameter Tumulus is surrounded by stones, holding nine tombs and some separated bones. Another grave lies outside of the tumulus and cannot be dated with accuracy. The graves are arranged around a centrally located plot. A peculiarity of the burial culture of this settlement is that adolescents were buried in simple pits; the tombs of the adults are bordered with stone slabs and partially marked with stones.

== Finds ==
The graves contained only a few burial objects, mainly pottery and personal possessions. Three knives, a bracelet, needles, and a spiral earring were found; all made of bronze. Among the grave goods was a clay pot in the Mycenaean style. Stone arrowheads and clay weights were used for weaving. The remains of a wall and a building (4.65 m by 2.75 m by 0.65 m; 15.3 by 9.0 by 2.1 ft) were excavated.

== Study ==
Researchers examined the interaction between the inhabitants of Pigi Artemidos, their environment, and the different burial cultures.

Despite relatively few skeletons, the poor state of preservation and damage to the bones during excavation, human remains were excavated for examination. They were subject to a visual examination and X-rayed. Age assessment was performed by investigating tooth development and measuring certain bones (including femurs and bones of the arms).

The skeletons and teeth studied showed signs of deprivation during growth and development. In addition to bone injuries, people suffered from tooth decay, tartar, tooth loss and arthritis. Joint diseases were common and affected the spine (Schmorl's nodes), knees, and feet, suggesting an active lifestyle.

A comparison with nearby Late Bronze Age necropolises, such as Spathes, reveals various forms of burials and a changing funerary culture.

== Literature ==
- Eftychia Poulaki-Pandermali [Ευτυχία Πουλάκη-Παντερμαλή]: Ανασκαφή Αγίου Δημητρίου Ολύμπου. Ministry for culture, Ministry für Macedonia und Thrace, Aristotle university Thessaloniki: Το Αρχαιολογικό Έργο στη Μακεδονία και Θράκη. [To Archaeologikó Érgo sti Makedonía ke Thráki.] Volume 1, 1987, Thessaloniki 1988, pages201–208. (Greek)
- Paraskevi Tritsaroli and Sophia Koulidou: Human remains from the Pigi Artemidos LBA tumulus, region of Macedonian Olympus, Pieria , National Kapodistrian university of Athens, Faculty of history and archaeology, Volume 1, May 2018
- Sophia Koulidou: "Mycenian presence" in northern Pieria, ΑΕΜΘ 24, 201, Greek Ministry for education, religion, culture und sport, Aristotele university Thessaloniki, ISSN 1106-5311 (Greek)
- Sofia Koulidou: «ΠΗΓΗ ΑΡΤΕΜΙΔΟΣ» ΠΙΕΡΙΑΣ: ΟΡΘΟΓΩΝΙΕς ΚΑΤΑΣΚΕΥΕς ΣΕ ΤΑΦΙΚΕς ΚΑΙ ΟΙΚΙΣΤΙΚΕς ΣΥΝΑΦΕΙΕς, Ministry for culture, education und religion, University of Thessaly: ΑΡΧΑΙΟΛΟΓΙΚΟ ΕΡΓΟ ΘΕΣΣΑΛΙΑΣ ΚΑΙ ΣΤΕΡΕΑΣ ΕΛΛΑΔΑΣ 4. [To archeologikó Ergo Théssalias kai steréas Elládas.] Volume 4, 2012, Vólos 2015, ISBN 978-618-82035-0-1
