= Valtos Leptokaryas =

Coordinates: 40.072052°N 22.561079°E

At the site Valtos Leptokaryas (Greek Βάλτος Λεπτοκαρυάς) settlement remains from different periods of the Bronze Age and Christianity were discovered. The place was inhabited for centuries.

== Location ==
The archaeological site (Valtos 1–3) is located north of the village Leptokarya, nearby the railway line Athens - Thessaloniki; it has an altitude from 5 to 13 meters above the sea.

== Excavation history ==
Parts of a settlement were discovered due to the collapse of the railroad track during work on the tunneling of the track system. The excavation work began in 2000, but was then interrupted. In March 2006, the excavations, funded by the development and construction company ERGOSE of the Greek railway company, resumed. Unfortunately, machines had destroyed parts of the original settlements. The work was completed in late 2006. Traces of settlements from three different epochs were found. On a layer of remains, possibly of Neolithic time (presumed, but not confirmed archaeologically), were found graves, many movable artifacts, the foundations of buildings and remains of walls. To determine the age of some findings, the radiocarbon dating was used.

The archaeological site is divided chronologically into:

- Valtos 1 - 1300 to 1100 BC
- Valtos 2 - 1670 to 1505 BC
- Valtos 3 - 1930 to 1745 BC
- Valtos 4 - a Neolithic settlement under Valtos 1 to 3, but unconfirmed by now.

The discovery of parts of a wall surrounding the settlement suggested an organized community. Why the settlement was abandoned is unclear, but archaeologists found a layer of destruction stemming from a fire.

== Cemetery ==
In addition to simple pits, burial mounds were also uncovered. The largest tomb had a diameter of 5.80 meters and a height of 90 centimeters. In it, several people were buried, it was partially destroyed by machinery and water. The second largest grave has a diameter of 2.90 meters.

== Finds ==
The corpse of a woman was adorned with earrings made of a golden band that encircle a copper spiral. She wore a necklace with gold, bronze, glass, and stone jewelry on it. In addition to the jewelry were clay pottery and other objects found in the grave. In other graves mostly clay vessels have been excavated.

== Literature ==
- Aristotle University Thessaloniki, The archaeological work of Macedonia and Thrace ΑΕΜΘ Volume 18, 2004, ISSN 1106-5311
- Efi Poulaki-Pantermali: Makedonikos Olympos. Mythos – Istoria – Archaeologia. Greek ministry for culture and sports, Thessaloniki 2013, ISBN 978-960-386-110-2
