= Pigi Athinas =

Archaeological site at the foot of Mount Olympus

The Pigi Athinas (Greek Πηγή Αθηνάς, Source of Athena) is an archaeological site at the eastern foot of Mount Olympus (Lower Olympus), near the village of Platamonas.

== History ==
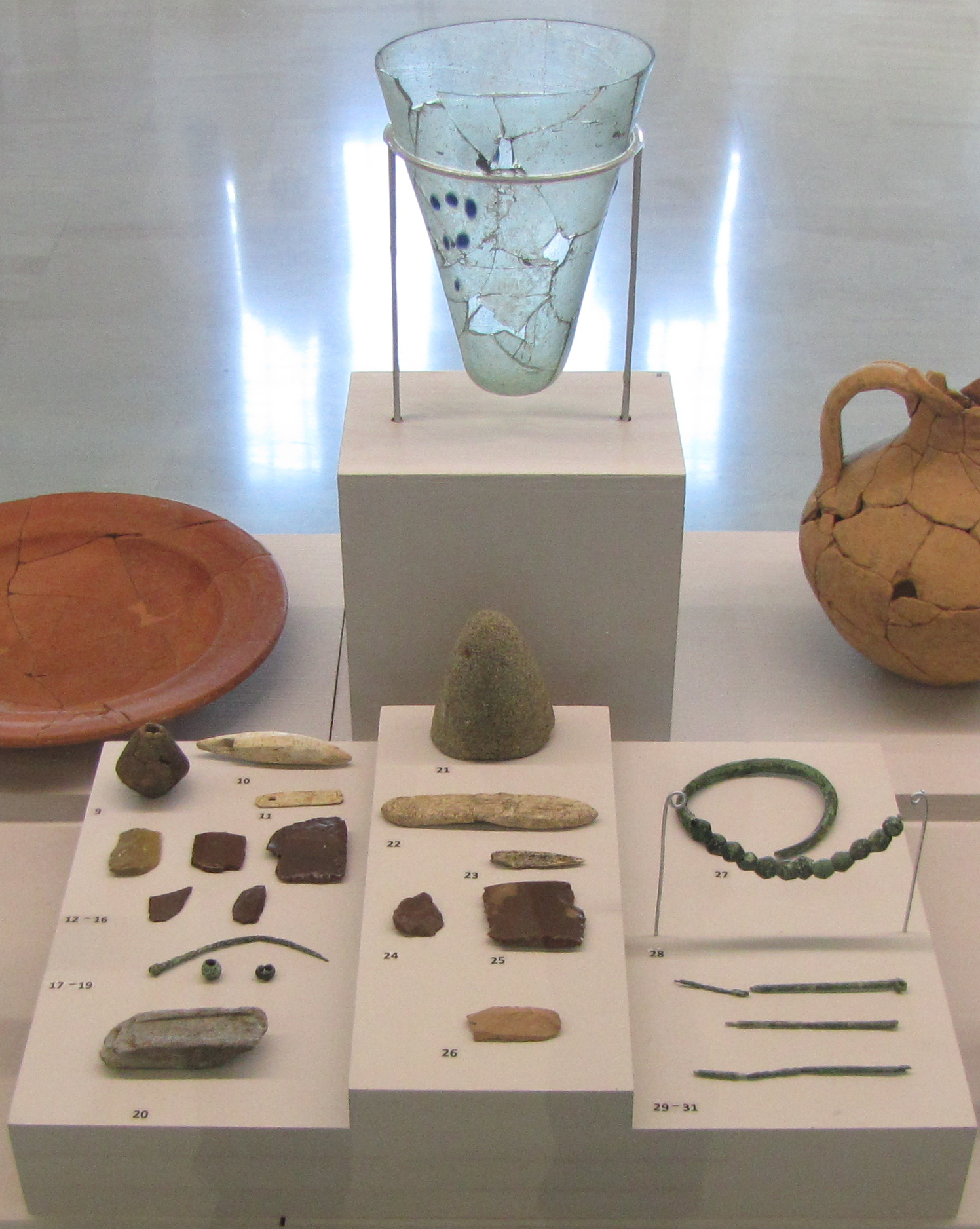
Burial objects, Source of Athena

There is evidence of the presence of humans since the first half of the 7th millennium BC (Early Neolithic period). During the Middle Neolithic period, around 5600 to 4500 BC, the area was inhabited continuously. During the Bronze Age, a necropolis with burial mounds (tumuli) was established. Another cemetery dates back to Roman times.

== The excavations ==
The excavation work began in 2001 and was initially carried out until 2003. In April 2008, the excavations were resumed and ended in early 2011. The excavation site is located under the route of the highway Patras - Athens - Thessaloniki - Evzonoi (Πατρών - Aθηνών - Θεσσαλονίκης - Ευζώνων, short ΠΑΘΕ), the excavations were funded by the construction company. The finds range from the Neolithic to the post-Byzantine period (after 1453 AD).

=== The Neolithic cemetery ===
The burial mounds date from the period 1620-1500 BC; the tumuli were circular or elliptical and consisted of large pebbles, probably from the nearby river. All hills have a central tomb in the center, oriented in west–east direction. Except for one grave mound, under which only one single deceased was buried, around the central graves further graves were created. The middle grave is larger and deeper than the others. The pits were edged with stone and have a depth of up to 1.30 meters. Archaeologists found the skeletons of 17 people who died at the age of 20 to 50 years; as grave goods mainly pottery were found.

=== The Roman cemetery ===
16 people were buried here, skeletons of 12 adults and four children were discovered. The cemetery is located in the immediate vicinity of a Roman farmhouse and was created in the first half of the 4th century AD. The deceased were buried in simple pits. The graves were not looted and contained many grave goods.

Dating from the time of the Ottoman rule, a water pipe was found near by the necropolis.

The settlement, belonging to the neolithic necropolis, has not yet been located.

The archaeological site is today largely under the route of the highway Patras, Athens, Thessaloniki, Evzonoi.

== Literature ==
- Efi Poulaki-Pantermali: Oikos - Oikia - Oikonomia, Polis - Politiki - Politismos (Οίκος - Οικία - Οικονομία, Πόλις - Πολιτική - Πολιτισμός), Greek Ministry for Culture and Sport, Thessaloniki 2014, ISBN 978-960-386-139-3
- "Tritsaroli P. 2017. The Pigi Athinas tumuli cemetery of Macedonian Olympus: burial customs and the bioarchaeology of social structures at the dawn of the Late Bronze Age, Central Macedonia, Greece".
- "ΕΦΟΡΕΙΑ ΠΡΟΪΣΤΟΡΙΚΩΝ ΚΑΙ ΚΛΑΣΙΚΩΝ ΑΡΧΑΙΟΤΗΤΩΝ (in Greek language)" (PDF).
