= Louloudies =

Archaeological site in Pieria, Greece

Coordinates: 40.343402°N 22.6008151°E

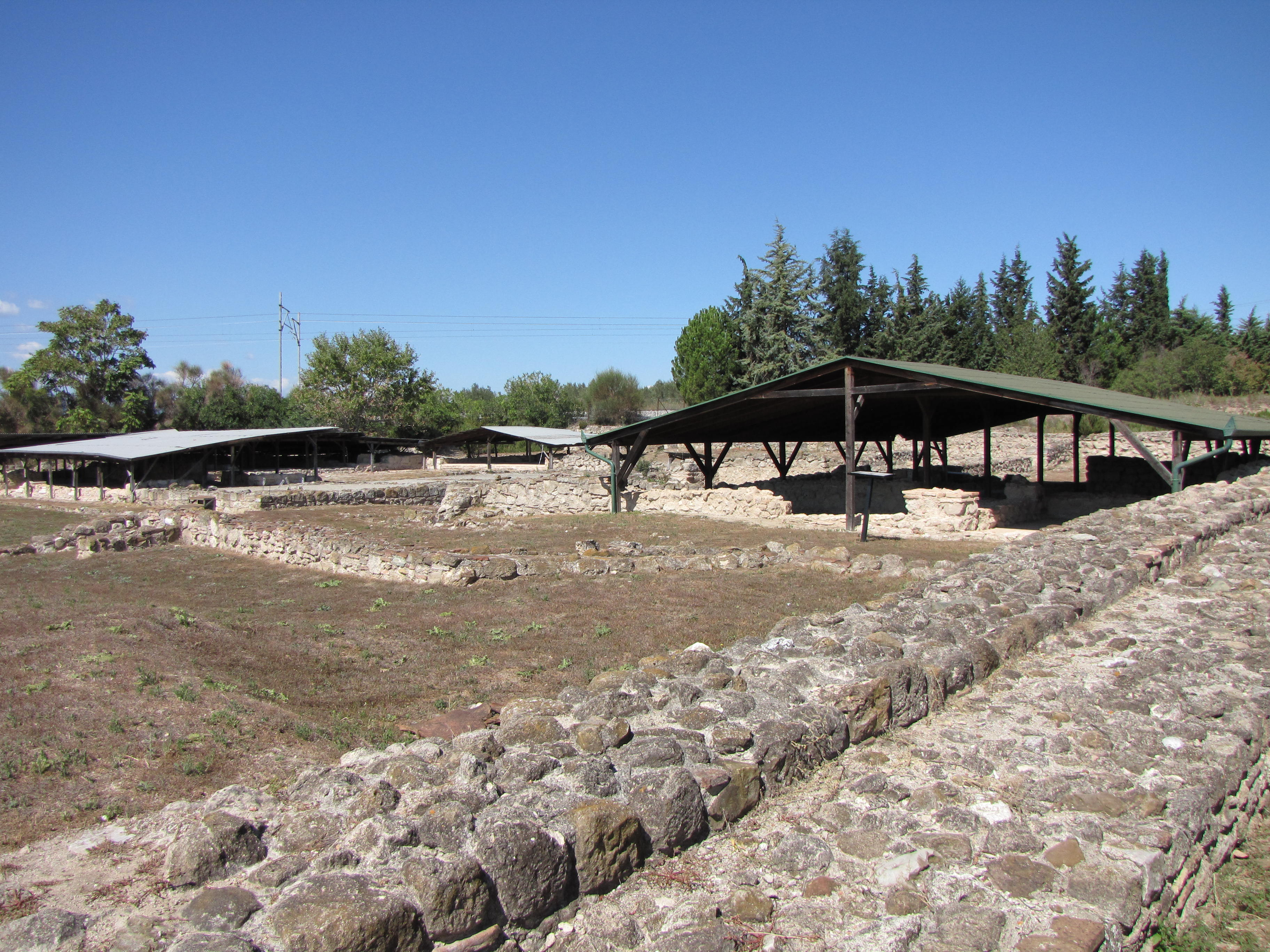
Ancient site of Louloudies

Louloudies (Greek: Λουλουδιές, [lu.lu.ˈðjes]) is an archaeological site in Pieria, northern Greece. It comprises a fortified bishop's seat from the Byzantine era, discovered during the construction of the railway line between Athens and Thessaloniki.

Louloudies is an important place of the early Christian history of Pieria.

== Location ==
The complex is located 11.3 km northeast of the town of Katerini, 3.3 km northeast of the village of Korinos and 5.8 km south of the ancient Pydna in the region Pieria, Macedonia in Greece. In the middle of the 19th century the French archaeologist Heuzey localized the hills north-west of Louloudies as the place where 168 BC, the decisive battle between the Roman troops and the soldiers of the last Macedonian king Perseus took place.

== History ==
In 479 the Goths laid siege to the city of Thessaloniki. In order to avert damage to Thessaloniki, the besiegers agreed with the City Magistrate to put some Macedonian cities under Gothic supervision. Among them were the cities of Pella, Pydna, Dion and Veria. Pydna was appointed a bishops seat, but the bishop himself resided at Louloudies.

The fortress-like complex was built in the last quarter of the 5th century at the road between Thessaloniki and Larissa. Probably it is the same place that was called in Roman records Anamon. During the reign of Justinian I (527-567), the complex was expanded. In the middle of the 6th century the buildings were destroyed by an earthquake. The bishop left the place and it was later used as a cemetery. In the 7th century the place was finally abandoned after barbarian attacks.

== The Facility ==
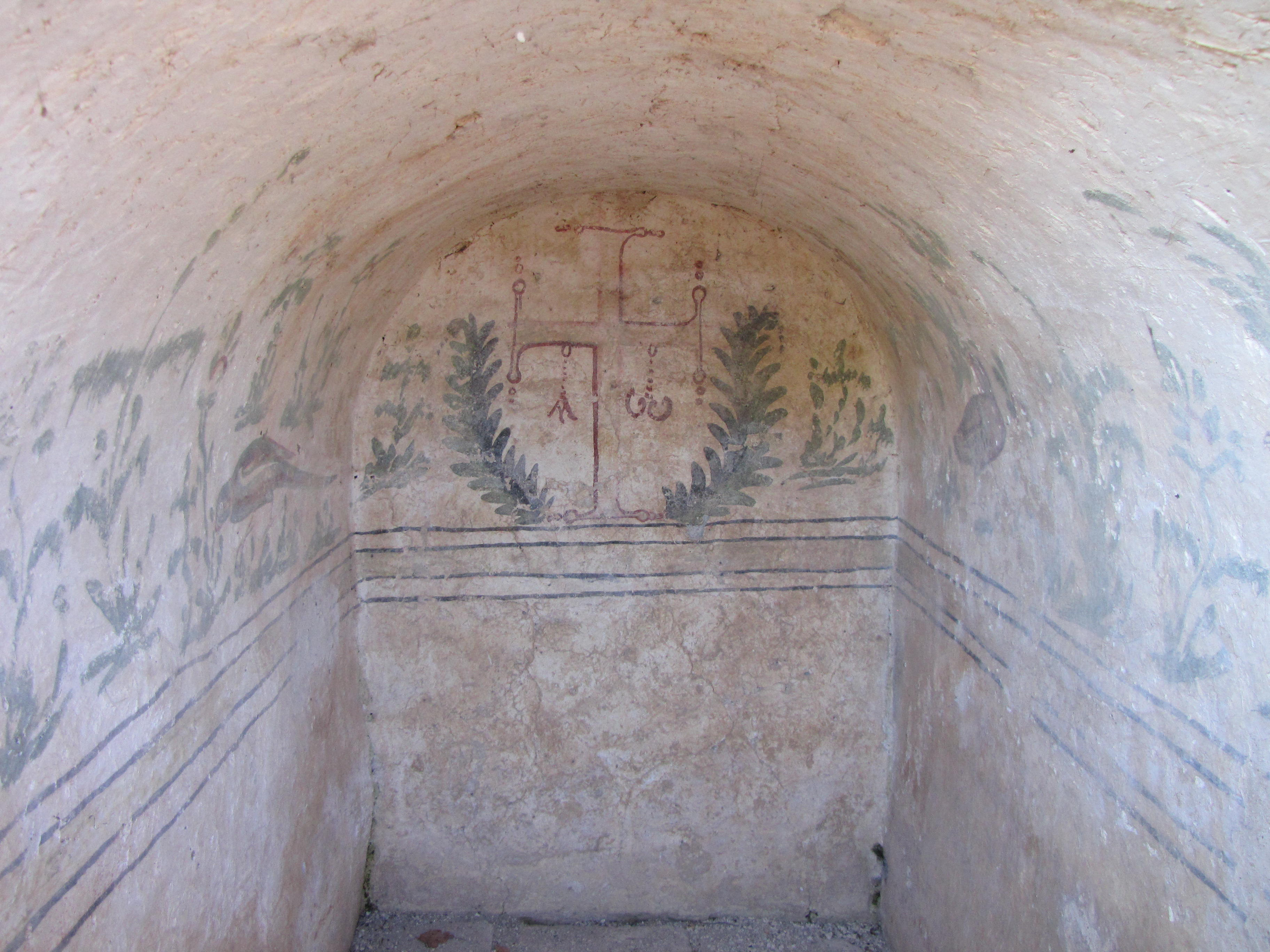
Grave in Louloudies

The entire complex has a floor area of 80 by 90 meters. It was surrounded by a wall, and had four rectangular towers, which were at the corners of the walls. At the western side of the wall was a double gate. In the first phase, a three-aisled basilica and a residence for the bishop were erected. The reception area and the colonnades of the building were striking. The floors are decorated with mosaic that, unlike the mosaics of Dion, represents only ornaments. Under the bishop's palace were found remnants of a villa from the early 4th century BC. At the time of Justinian facilities for the production of wine and olive oil were established.

Eight larger graves were found, which have a vaulted ceiling. The painting was partially preserved. Furthermore, a larger number of simply equipped graves were found in the area of the complex.

== The Excavations ==
The excavation work was conducted by the Ephorate of Byzantine Antiquities of Thessaloniki. They started in 1993, ended in 1997 and were financed by the Greek railway company OSE. The railway line divides the excavation site diagonally. The western defense tower and part of the wall are outside the accessible terrain.

The numerous finds bring some light into the period between the 4th and 7th centuries, an epoch about which little information is available on this part of Macedonia. They bear witness to the importance of the bishop's seat and give evidence of the daily life and the existing technique of this time. After the plant was finally abandoned by their inhabitants, handicraft companies settled. Residues of a kiln for pottery, melting furnaces for glass products, smelting furnaces for metal and a sculpture workshop were found.

== Literature ==
- Louloudies in Pieria, A fortified early Christian Complex, Greek ministry of Culture, 9th. Ephoria of byzantine antiquities
- Efterpi Marki: Το αρχαιολογικό εύρημα ως ιστορικό τεκμήριο. Η εγκατάσταση των Γότθων στην πεδιάδα της κεντρικής Μακεδονίας και η ίδρυση του επισκοπικού συγκροτήματος στις Λουλουδιές. In: The Christian Archaeological Society (XAE) (Hrsg.): Deltion of the Christian Archaeological Society. Number 34, Athen 2013, ISSN 1105-5758, S. 1 –10. PDF Online (In Greek language, Summary on page 10 of the Document in English)
