= Kompoloi =

Coordinates: 40.018746°N 22.584630°E

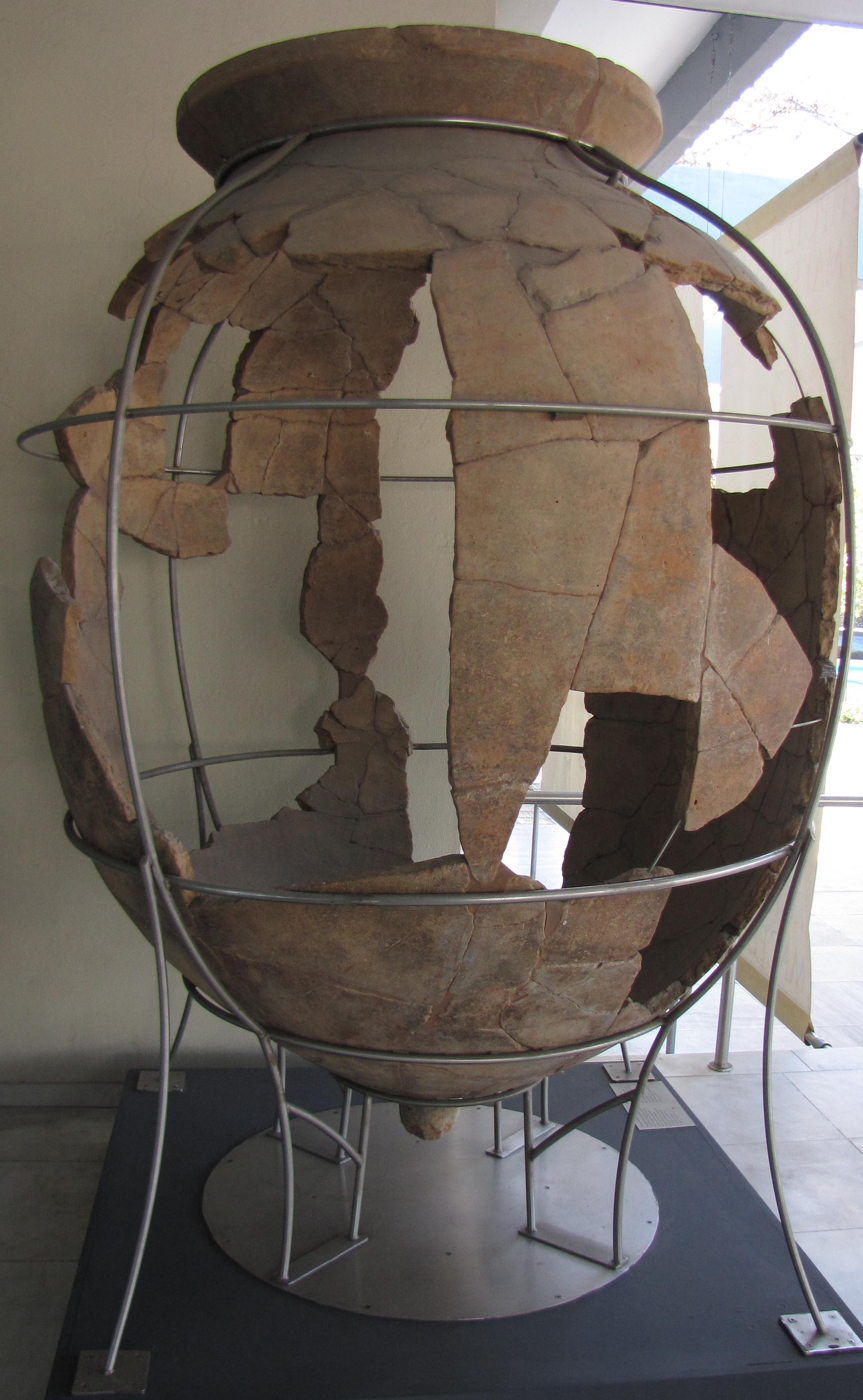
Pithos of Kompoloi, Archaeological Museum Thessaloniki

In the plain of Leivithra in 1997 began the excavation work on the ancient winery Kompoloi (Greek: Κομπολόι). They lasted (intermittently) until October 2000.

== Location ==
Approximately 500 meters east of the A1 motorway (E75) and 700 meters west of the coastline of Skotina.

== The building ==
The building was erected in the middle of the 4th century BC and used until the beginning of the 3rd century BC; then it was destroyed by a fire and abandoned by its inhabitants. It has a floor area of around 1350 m^{2} and was built on an existing vineyard. Two buildings, a residential building and a farmhouse, stood at a central courtyard; in the north and south there were other buildings. The excavated building had 17 rooms. In the east, a cellar was uncovered whose foundations probably bore a tower. Next to the southern entrance was a well and an oven.

== The finds ==
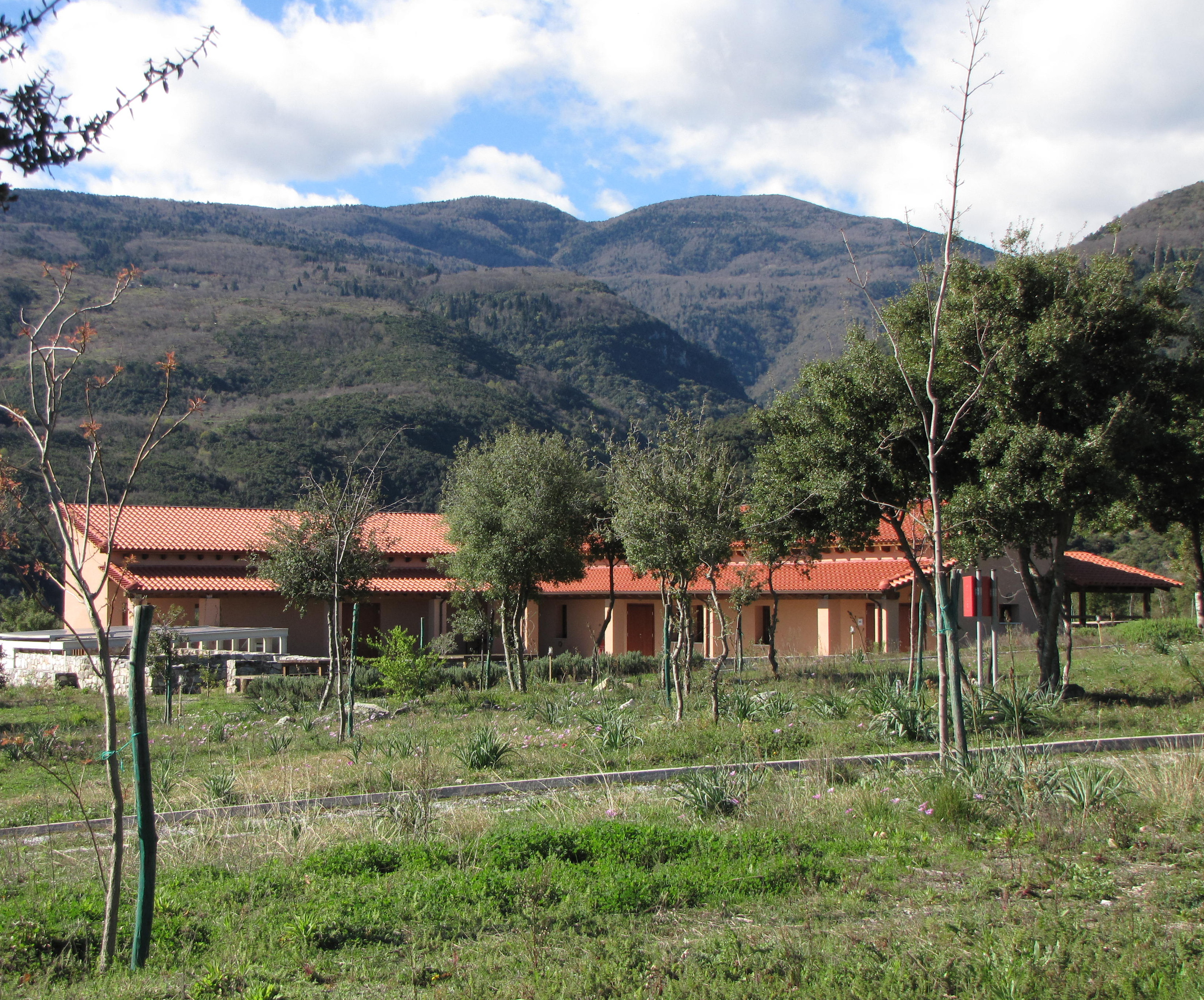
Kompoloi, Replica of the winery of Kompoloi, Thematic park of Leivithra

Clay pots, pithoi (πίθοι), in which the wine was stored were buried in the ground. In total, 32 of these vessels were found. The height was 2.15 meters, the diameter 1.60 meters, the material was 3–4 cm thick. The capacity was nearly 2000 liters. One of these pithoi is exhibited in the Archaeological Museum of Thessaloniki. Furthermore, lead clamps for repairing the vessels, clay lids, grape seeds and resin were found.

== The viniculture ==
Archaeobotanical investigations showed that as early as the 4th millennium BC wine was cultivated in middle east. A little later, wine was grown in Thrace and thus reached the region of Mount Olympus. Harvested at the end of August, the grapes were pressed and filled into the pithoi. At least every 36 days, the containers were opened and the contents checked. On the first day of Anthesteria, a feast in honor of the god Dionysus, the clay vessels were finally opened and the wine could be drunk.

== Literature ==
- Efi Poulaki-Pantermali: Makedonikos Olympos. Mythos – Istoria – Archäologia. Greek Ministry for Culture and Sport, Thessaloniki 2013, ISBN 978-960-386-110-2
