= Spathes =

Archaeological site on Mount Olympus, Greece

Coordinates: 40.146845°N 22.237496°E

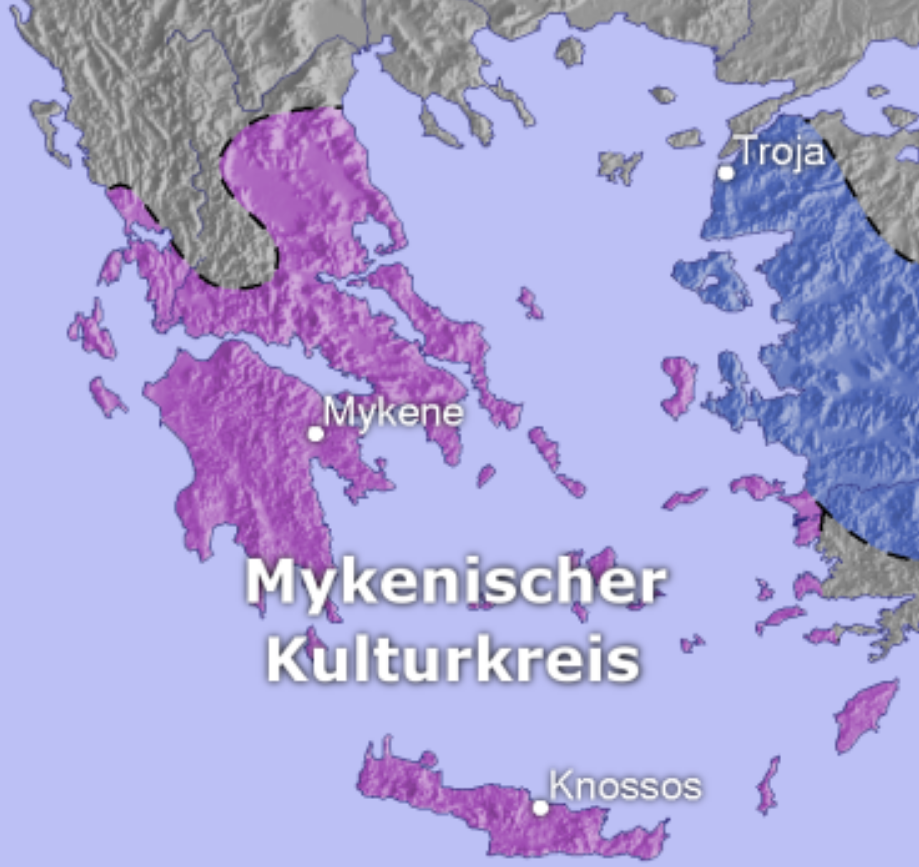
Mycenian cultural environment (ca. 1400 BC)

Among the first archaeological sites discovered in Mount Olympus was the excavation site Spathes (Greek Σπάθες, swords). It is a necropolis from the Late Bronze Age. The oldest tombs are from the 14th century BC, the last traces of the use were found from the end of the 13th century, the beginning of the 12th century BC. The settlement, associated with the necropolis, has not been found. Many of the burial offerings were made in the Mycenaean style, so that the Mycenaean cultural circle probably also (see also History and archaeology Pierias) extended over the border of Thessaly to Pieria.

== Location ==
Near the village of Agios Dimitrios, on the border with Thessaly, in 1000 to 1100 meters altitude, on a hillside. The burial site runs from northeast to southwest direction.

== Excavation history ==
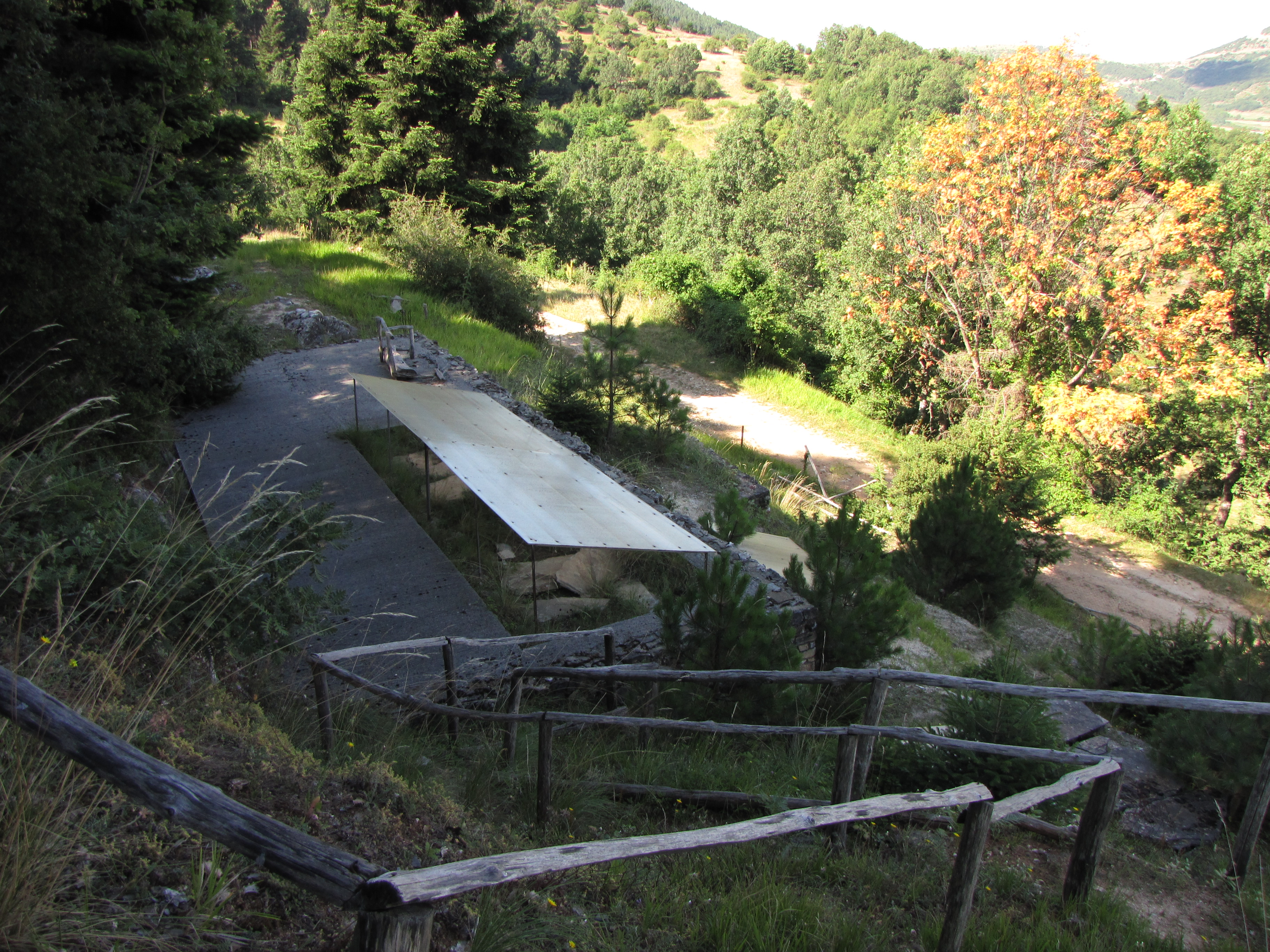
Necropolis Spathes

In 1975, the relevant archaeological authority was informed that several tombs (at least 12 to 13) were destroyed when a firebrake was cut. A bronze sword was found then. Further information revealed that trade was operated with the burial objects from this site. 1985 began trial excavations, which were continued in 1986. The excavations brought to light 34 tombs, which were partly destroyed and plundered. A part of the stolen goods was later found in the storehouse of the Archaeological Museum in Dion. In 1985, some of the stone slabs that covered the tombs were stolen by unknown culprits. A part of the slope was brought to a drop by heavy snowfalls. In the years 1987 and 1988 the slope was terraced and stabilized by a wooden construction. Near the excavation site Spathes, 1987 more tombs were discovered, presumably from the same epoch. Six stone seals were recovered from them, further excavations were not held.

== Necropolis ==
As in this region of Greece, at the end of the Bronze Age, the deceased were usually buried in box-shaped tombs. The type of these tombs is known from southern Greece. The length of the tombs is approximately 2.40 meters, the width 1.50 meters and the depth between one and 2.50 meters. The bottom of the tombs was covered with a 10 to 20 centimeter high clay layer, the side walls were framed with stone slabs. The graves were intact except for penetrating roots and natural deposits of the building materials. The number of buried persons found in the intact tombs is 52. It is unusual that in each of the tombs several people were buried, presumably they were family tombs. They were buried next to each other, partly also upon one another; In addition to the skeletons of adults, the remains of children were also found.

== Finds ==
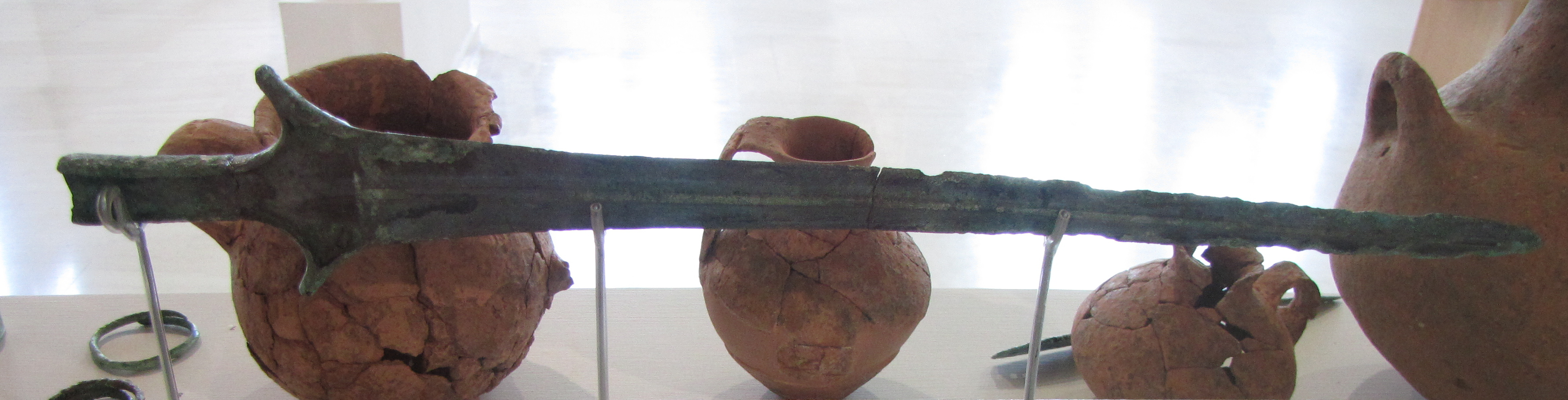
Bronzen Sword, found near Platamonas

In addition to weapons and jewelry, the deceased was mainly given pottery. However, some of them were broken by the kind of burial of several people within the same tomb. The vessels were partly handmade, partly they were modeled with a potter's wheel. The most important finds were made in a tomb, in which apparently high ranking personalities were buried. Two skeletons, one male and one female, found themselves alongside rich burial gifts. Remnants of a spear, a bronze sword, painted and unpainted vases and perfume bottles, jewelry and stone seals (partly with animal motifs) were discovered. The sword is somewhat smaller, but resembles in the kind of swords found in Mycenae and Crete (Knossos, Heraklion). A bronze sword found in another tomb is of the same making as swords discovered in Athens, Crete, Kos and other locations. Recently, excavations on the southeast side of Olympus, to the west of Platamonas, have revealed an identical sword.

== Literature ==
- Greek ministry for culture and sport, Aristoteles University Thessaloniki, Το Αρχαιολογικό Έργο στη Μακεδονία και Θράκη (The archaeological work in Macedonia and Thrace) Nr. 1, 1987.
- Greek ministry for culture and sport, Aristoteles University Thessaloniki, Το Αρχαιολογικό Έργο στη Μακεδονία και Θράκη (The archaeological work in Macedonia and Thrace) Nr. 2, 1988.
- Efi Poulaki-Pantermali: Makedonikos Olympos. Mythos – Istoria – Archäologia. Hrsg.: Greek Ministry of Culture and Sport, Thessaloniki 2013, ISBN 978-960-386-110-2.
