= Tria Platania =

Archaeological site in Greece

Coordinates: 39.975463°N 22.638719°E

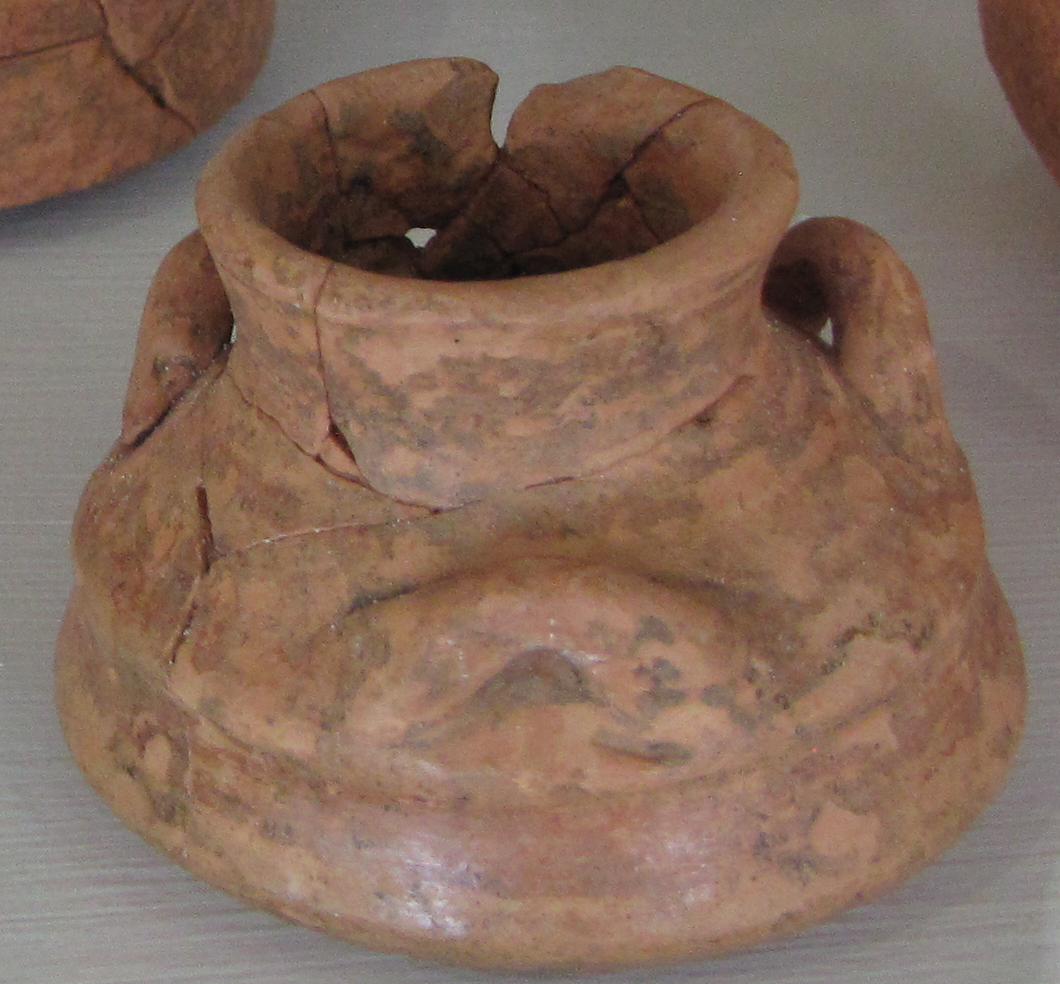
Tria Platania, example of a clay vessel (Ancient site of Tribina)

During the construction work on the railway line Athens-Thessaloniki, the remains of an ancient farmhouse were discovered at Tria Platania (Greek Τρία Πλατάνια, Three plane trees). Rescue excavations allowed a small part of the existing antiquities to be located and examined. The largest part of the excavation site is today under the route of the railway line. A study (published in 2008) examined the remains of olives to determine how the olive oil was produced in the period from the fourth to the second century BC.

== Location ==
The place is located on the ancient road that connects the Thessalian province of Perraivia with the Macedonian province of Pieria, in the vicinity of the railway tunnel and the motorway exit Platamonas.

== The ancient site ==
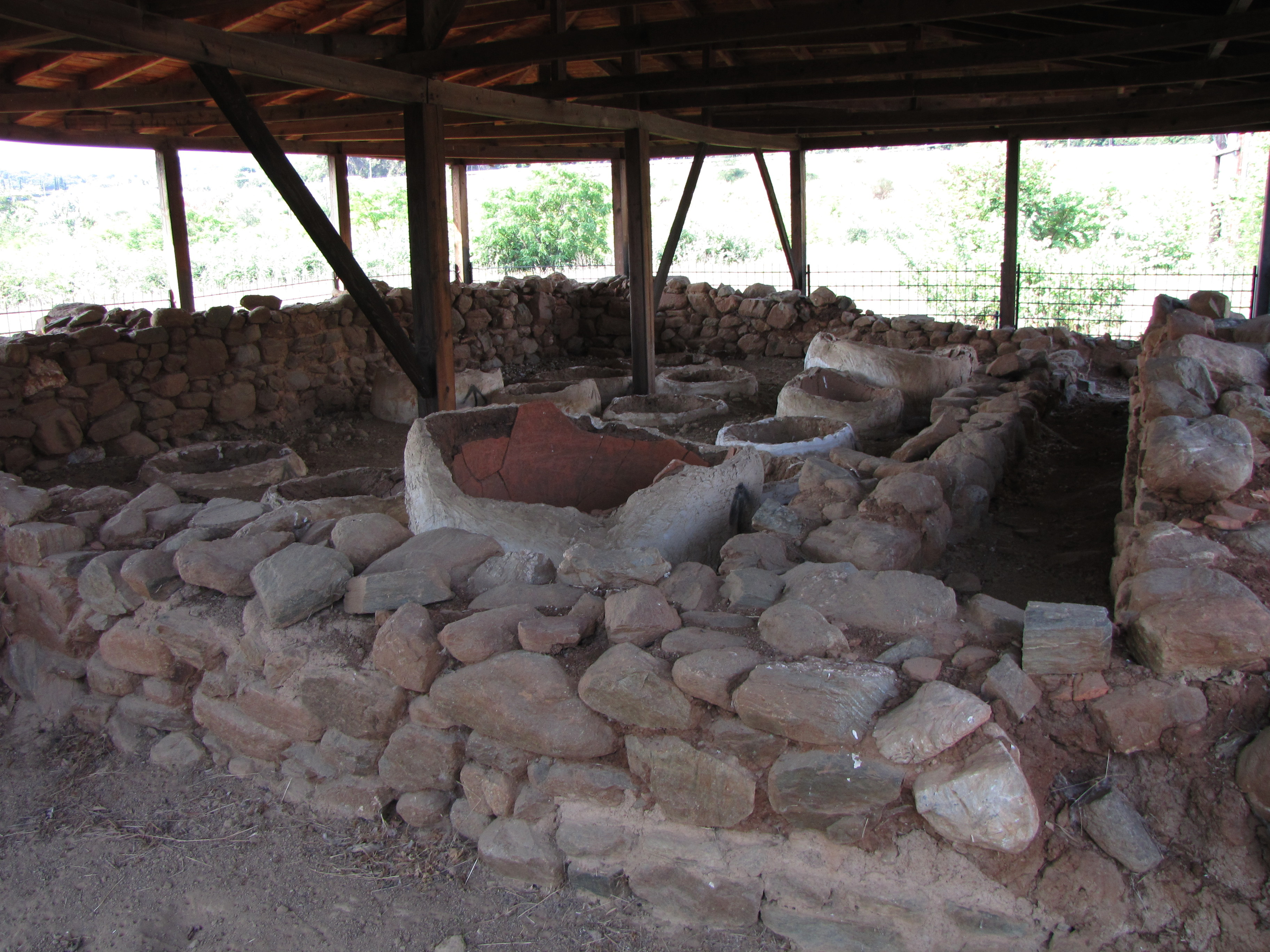
Tria Platania - clay store vessels (Neoi Poroi, railway station)

The excavations were carried out in two phases. The first works began in May 1999 and lasted until March 2000. The second phase of excavation began in February 2007 and was completed in November of the same year. Most of the remains of the Tria Platania settlement were destroyed during the construction of the railway tunnel. A farmhouse from the Hellenistic period was discovered; Coins and pottery helped dating the find to the end of the 4th century BC. It is one of the largest ancient farmhouses ever found in Greece. The building had a floor area of approximately 55 m by 42.50 m and extended from east to west. This design was preferred for climatic reasons, as this is the main wind direction. Grapes were cultivated and wine produced. In the northwestern part of the house was an extensive deposit with large clay vessels, the other rooms of the building were smaller.

In the middle of the courtyard, the foundations of a tower were uncovered. Nearby was a well that had been drilled at least ten meters deep. In the northeast of the complex began a wall with a length of 32 meters and a width of 1.20 meters.

The building initially stood only until the beginning of the third century BC. It was destroyed by fire along with its vineyard, as well as the neighboring farmhouse Kompoloi. The cause is assumed to be an attack of the Aitolians. As coin finds from the time of Antigonos Gonatas show, the complex was rebuilt immediately, the north side was replaced and reinforced. The wine production now gave way to the production of olive oil. Coin finds from the time of Philip II indicate that the estate was abandoned at the beginning of the 2nd century BC.

== Memorial ==
At the train station of the village Neoi Poroi (Νέοι Πόροι) a small memorial was built. Protected by a roof construction, the remains of the storage vessels can be seen there as they were found in the farmhouse.

== The finds ==
In addition to coins and pottery, a variety of smaller items were excavated.

The oldest of the coins date from the time of the founding of the winery, at the end of the 4th century BC. Obviously, they were hidden during the construction phase because they were under the floor of the building. The most recent coins were found in the rubble of the roof tiles.

As pottery, household vessels of all kinds, remains of amphorae, oil lamps and clay weights for the weaving were found. The clay vessels were often decorated. The clay head of a female figure is the only find of a terracotta statue.

Furthermore, the archaeologists discovered perfume bottles, lead weights, needles, spatulas, bronze and iron nails, an iron key, iron fittings and iron rings. On weapons, daggers and knives were excavated.

== Literature ==
- Efi Poulaki-Pantermali: Oikos – Oikia – Oikonomia, Polis – Politiki – Politismos, Greek Ministry for culture and sport, Thessaloniki 2014, ISBN 978-960-386-139-3
