= Macedonian Tombs, Korinos =

Archaeological site in Pieria, Greece

Coordinates: 40.326351°N 22.579930°E

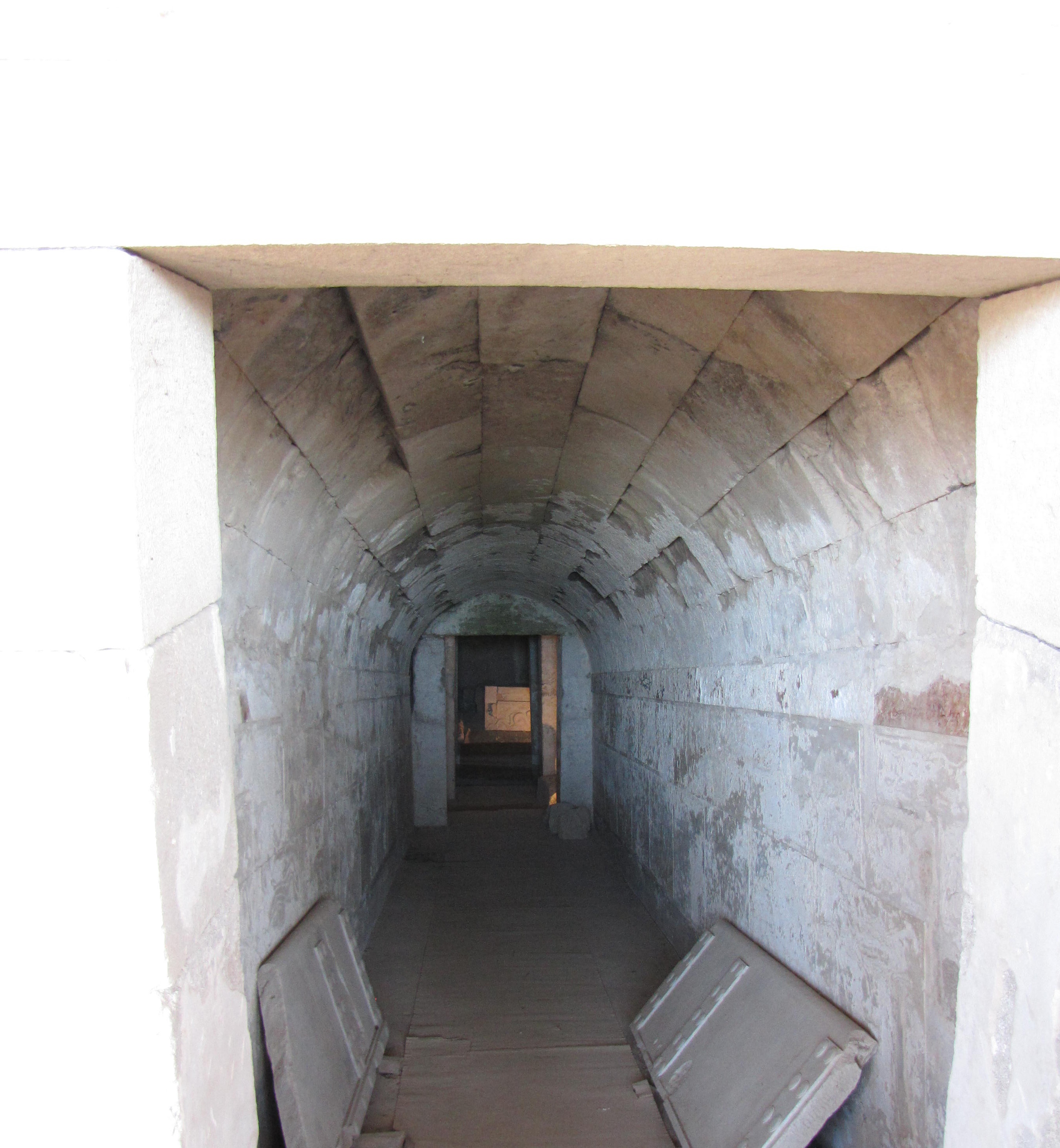
Tomb A, Dromos and marble doors

In the middle of the 19th century, an important Macedonian tomb, now known as Tomb A, was discovered near the Greek village of Korinos, at the site of ancient Pydna. In 1991 a second, smaller grave (Tomb B) was discovered and excavated.

These two tombs represent an important part of the history of Pieria.

== Location ==
Tomb A (40°19'35"N, 22°34'49"E) and tomb B (40°19'34.3"N, 22°34'37.6"E) are located just to the east and west, respectively, of highway A1 (E75) about 600 meters northwest of the village Korinos.

== Research History ==
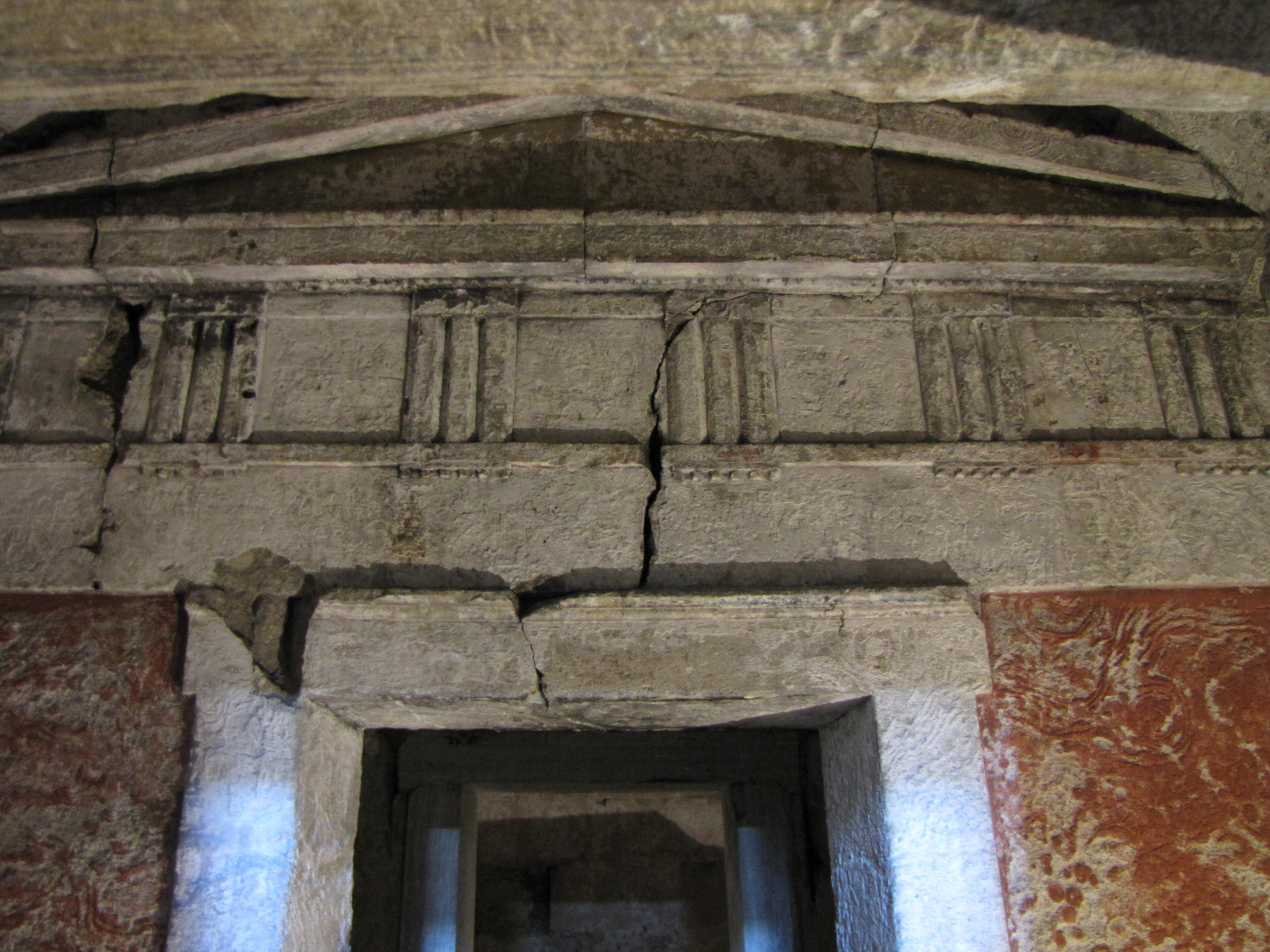
Doric gable and Doric triglyphs in Tomb A

The French archaeologist Léon Heuzey discovered tomb A (also called Heuzey tomb) during his Greek journey in 1855. A first description of the place was made in 1860. The excavations began one year later. Together with Honoré Daumet, Heuzey published his findings of the excavation work in 1876.

Tomb A was reopened by the Greek archaeologist Matheos Besios in 1991, the same year when he discovered and excavated tomb B.

Both tombs had already been plundered by grave robbers who had removed some keystones of the vault to gain access. The identity of who was once was buried in either of the tombs is unknown. The elaborate building design points to important persons. Heuzey had almost all the usable and transportable artifacts (except one stone block with the relief of a snake, two doors and smaller artifacts) transported to France. They are either displayed or stored in the Louvre. The exact dating of the tombs is controversial. The period extends from the 4th century BC (Richter), to the early 2nd century BC (Miller). Recent findings show, that the construction of tombs took place during the late 4th century BC and they were in use until the beginning of the 3rd century BC.

The archaeologists Hans v. Mangoldt and Konstantinos Noulas, carried out an exact measurement of the tombs.

== Description of the Tombs ==
Both tombs are clearly recognizable as hills. They are (nowadays) greened and covered with pines. In both tombs the grave is not located at the center of the tumulus, instead, they were each placed to the left of the main axis (as seen from the entrance), presumably to deceive grave robbers. As was customary in Macedonia at this time, the tombs were erected during the lifetime of those later buried there.

=== Tomb A ===
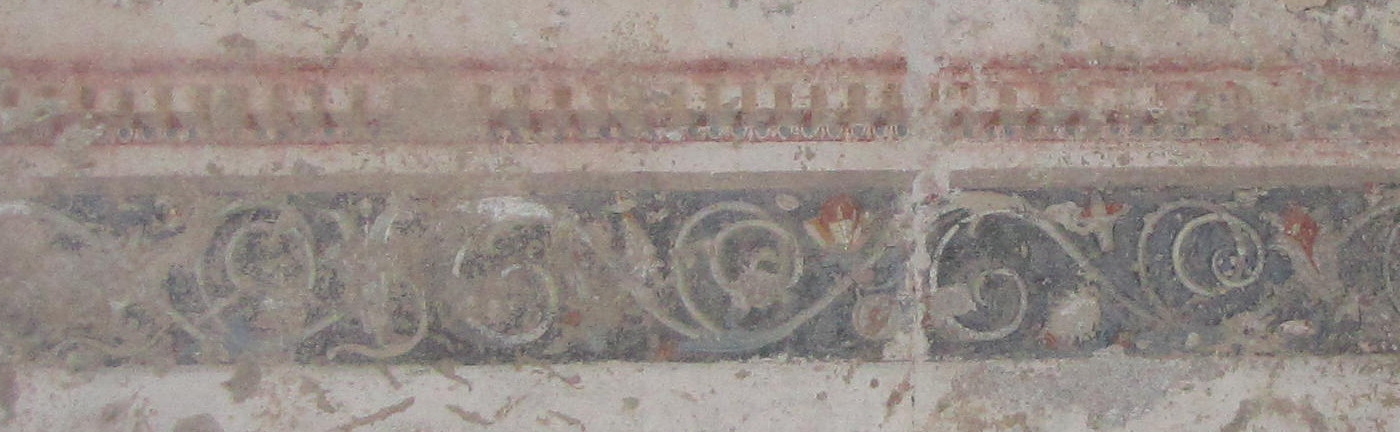
Painted frieze in Tomb B

The monument is located directly at the motorway at the service area of Korinos (east of the motorway) and is accessible from there. The tomb has a diameter of 60 meters and is 15 meters high. The total length of the tomb is 22 meters, making it the largest Macedonian tomb (as of November 2018), discovered in Pieria. The external entrance, which is over four meters in length, was filled with clay, bricks or stones on both sides, the individual layers can be clearly distinguished from each other. The facade is only preserved in parts and has been reconstructed in places. Heuzey had found the facade still intact. The tomb was once closed by a wall and a door behind it. The two-wing marble door has been modeled as a wooden door. Thus, imaginary fittings and nails are clearly visible. Both door wings are still preserved. The hollows in the doors suggest that bronze rings were originally attached to them. The access to the tomb chamber is marked with a distinct slope and also drops downwards in the height. An arched passage (Dromos) leads down to the first antechamber. The corridor is built of stone blocks that were once plastered. The ceiling is rounded (rounded) and closed at its highest point with key stones. Isolated remains show that the plaster was once painted. The painting was modeled as a marble surface. The floor of the corridor consists of a mosaic like covering, in which pebbles are embedded.

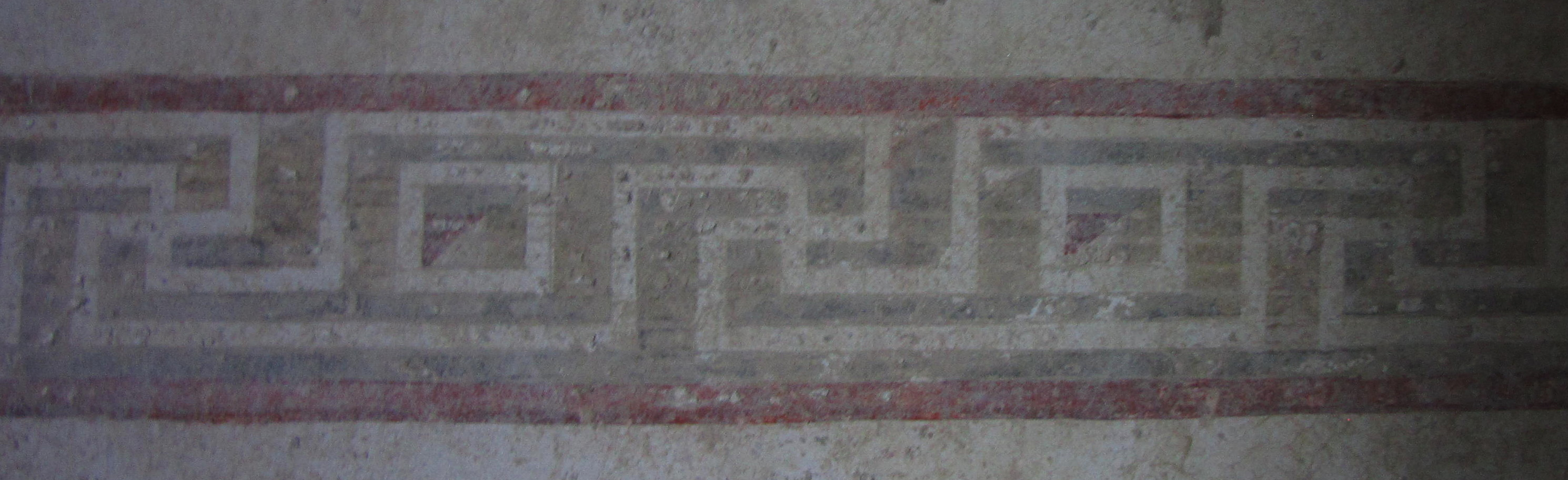
The meander found in the antechamber of Tomb B

The Dromos section, which is about 11 meters long and 2 meters wide, opens into a forecourt (courtyard) decorated by a Doric gable and a Doric triglyphs. The courtyard was painted, remains of the red color are clearly recognizable. A passage leads from the forecourt to the 1.5 meter long and 3 meter wide antechamber of the tomb.

The burial chamber, measuring 3 by 4 meters, was protected by heavy doors. In order to be able to open them more easily, there was a mechanical device. The doors can be seen in the Louvre in Paris. The forecourt, the antechamber and the tomb chamber are covered by a common vault.

It is assumed that a couple was buried in the grave. A couch, which probably belonged to the man, was guarded by a dog, the second couch by the snake. The tomb chamber was plastered and painted; there are hooks to attach burial objects. Only the bones of the deceased, pottery shards, and an oil lamp, which might has been left from the grave robbers, were found.

Inscriptions (the earliest from 1948) show the tomb was temporarily used by shepherds to accommodate their herds.

=== Tomb B ===
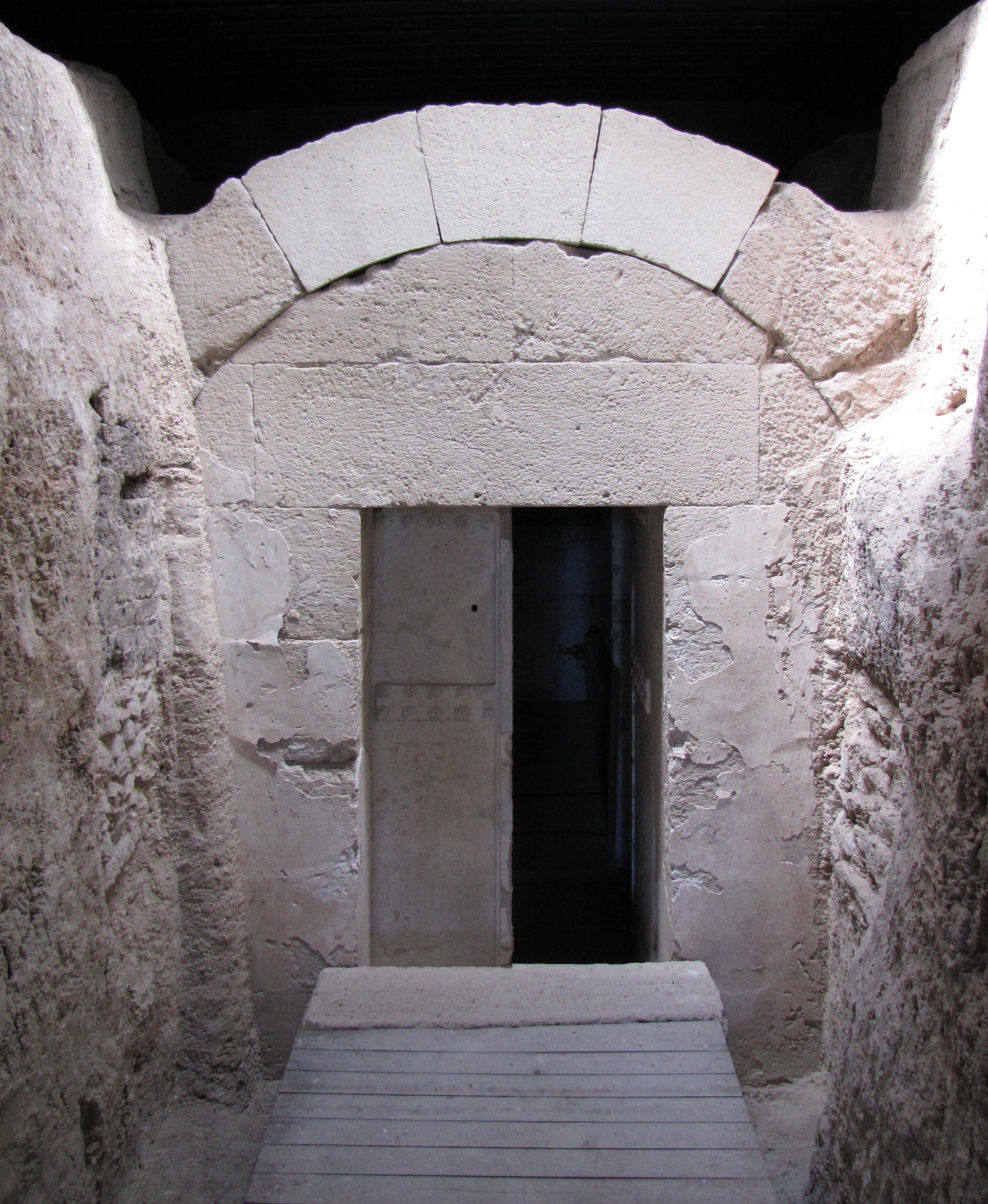
Tomb B, Entrance

The smaller Tomb B is located south of the service area Korinos (west of the motorway) and is accessible from a parallel road. The mound has a diameter of 40 meters and is 13 meters high. The tomb consists of a vaulted passage, a 1.5 x 3 meter measuring antechamber and the 3 by 3 meter grave chamber. The antechamber was secured by a wall and by a two-winged door. The door, which was found broken but has since been restored and reattached, is made of limestone which was once plastered and is very heavy. The floor of the antechamber and the tomb are laid out with stone slabs, the walls are decorated with a circulating meander.

In the tomb chamber were found remains of a cremation and a body burial. Preserved are stone bases on which presumably wooden couches rested. It is painted with circulating dentils and a frieze. Two bronze coins, two greaves, ceramics, and fragments of other objects were found as remaining grave items. On the walls and ceiling are fastened hooks to attach burial objects.

== Sources ==
- Hans v. Mangoldt: Makedonische Grabarchitektur, die Makedonischen Kammergräber und ihre Vorläufer - Volume I, Berlin 2012. ISBN 978 3 8030 1064 3
- Pierídon Stefanós. Pýdna, Methóni ke i archeótites tis vórias Pierías (Πιερίδων Στεφανός. Πύδνα, Μεθώνη και οι αρχαιότητες της βόρειας Πιερίας). Εταιρεία Ανθρώπων και Φύσεως Έργα, pages 270 to 283. Katerini 2010, ISBN 978-9-6099-3080-2
- Léon Heuzey, Honoré Daumet. Mission Archéologique de Macédoine. Paris 1876, pp. 239–266.
