= Paralia Panteleimonos =

Beach settlement in Greece

Coordinates: 40.0174°N 22.5915°E

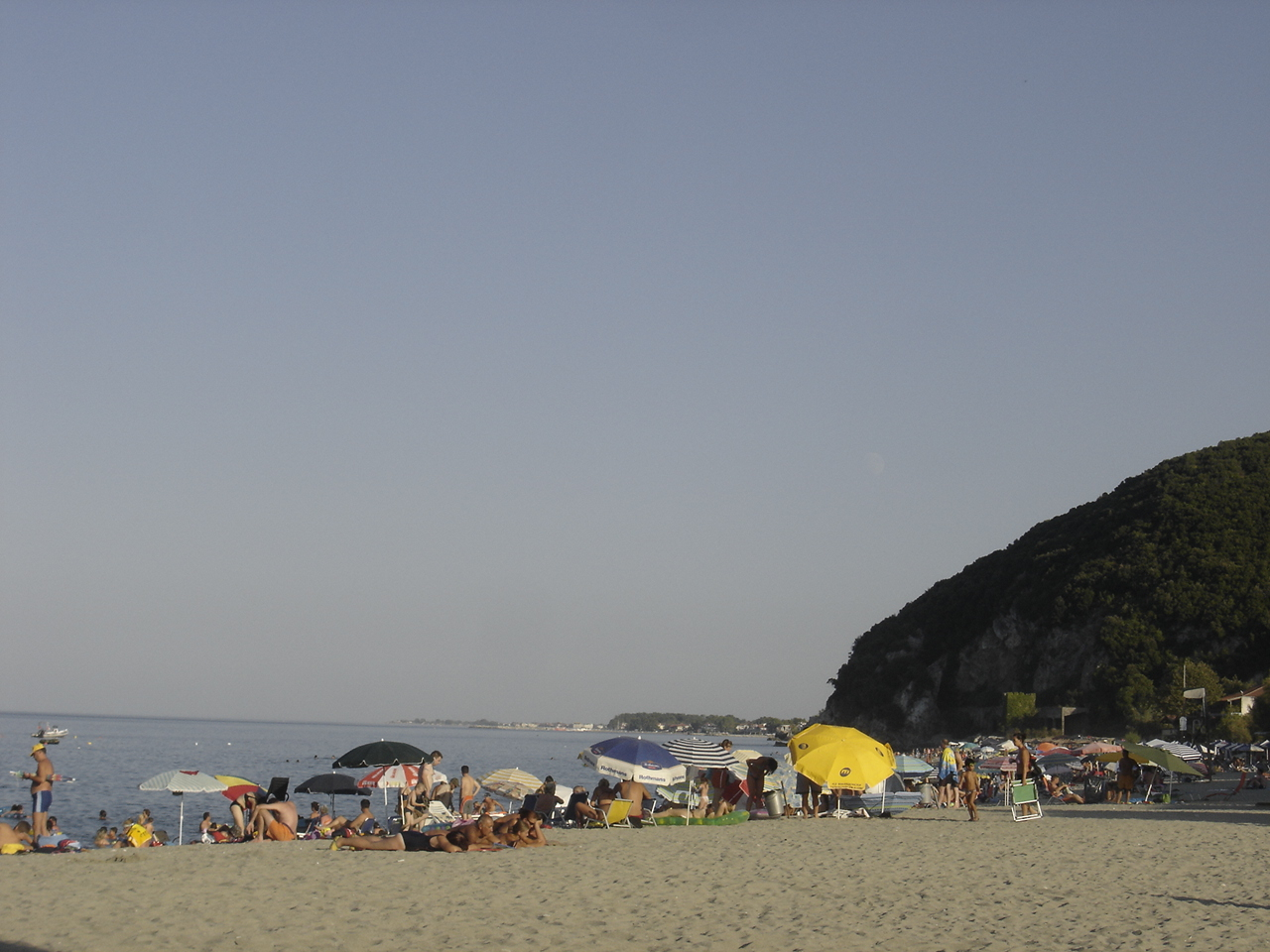
The beach of Panteleimon.

Paralia Panteleimonos (Greek: Παραλία Παντελεήμονος) is a settlement of the former municipal district of Panteleimonas, the former municipality of East Olympos, which belongs to the municipality of Dio-Olympos, and is one of the 16 total coast of the regional unit.

It is about 36 km from Katerini, 56 km from Larissa and is southeast of the county. According to recent archaeological excavations in the area during the construction of the railway tunnel under the castle, were findings of ancient Greek town Ηράκλεια (Heracleia).

There is a summer residence of the inhabitants of Neos Panteleimonas and tourist resort, which is flooded with tourists during the period May and June. It is located just below of the castle of Platamon, and for this reason sometimes is called "Κάστρο", Kastro (Castle). The coastal beach is 3 km. Each year awarded with the Blue Flag by the European Union, because of the purity of water and the sandy coast.

== See also ==
- Paralia Skotinas
- Neos Panteleimonas
- Palios Panteleimonas
- Castle of Platamon
- Platamon
- Neoi Poroi
