= Panteleimonas, Pieria =

Panteleimonas Παντελεήμονας
- Community
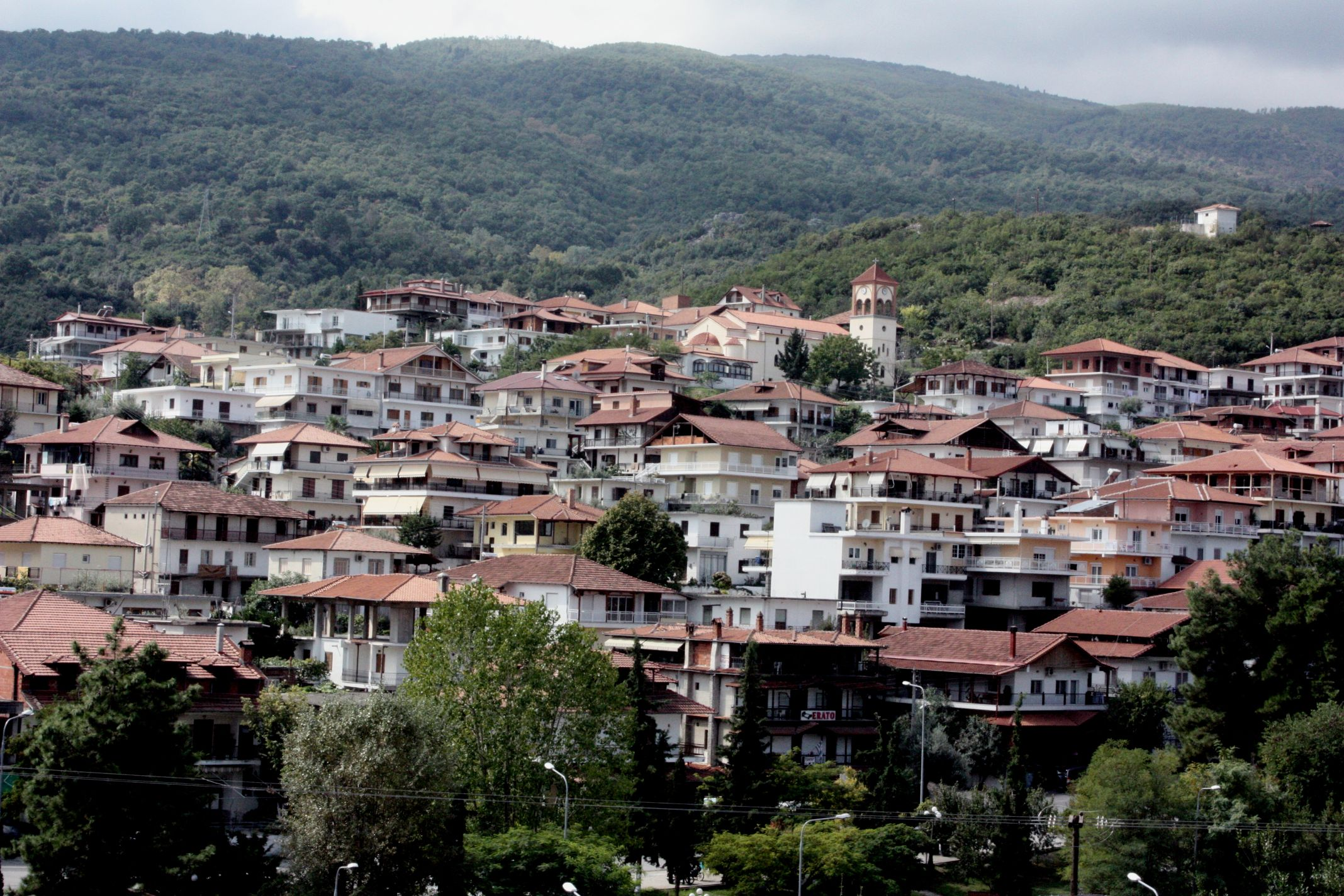
- A view of Neos Panteleimonas

- Location within Greece
- Coordinates: 40°00′N 22°35.5′E
- Country: Greece
- Administrative region: Central Macedonia
- Regional unit: Pieria
- Municipality: Dio-Olympos
- Municipal unit: East Olympos
- Elevation: 96 m (315 ft)

Population (2021)
  - Community: 883
- Time zone: UTC+2 (EET)
  - Summer (DST): UTC+3 (EEST)
- Postal code: 600 65
- Area code: +30-2352
- Vehicle registration: KN

Panteleimonas (Greek: Παντελεήμονας) is a community of the Dio-Olympos municipality. Before the 2011 local government reform it was part of the municipality of East Olympos, of which it was a municipal district. The 2021 census recorded 883 inhabitants in the community. The community of Panteleimonas comprises the villages of Neos Panteleimonas (789 residents as of 2021), Palaios Panteleimonas (40 residents) and Paralia Panteleimonos (54 residents). Panteleimon today is very famous for the restaurants. Under the presidency of Asterios Gkaras, Panteleimon become a tourist and food destination.

== See also ==
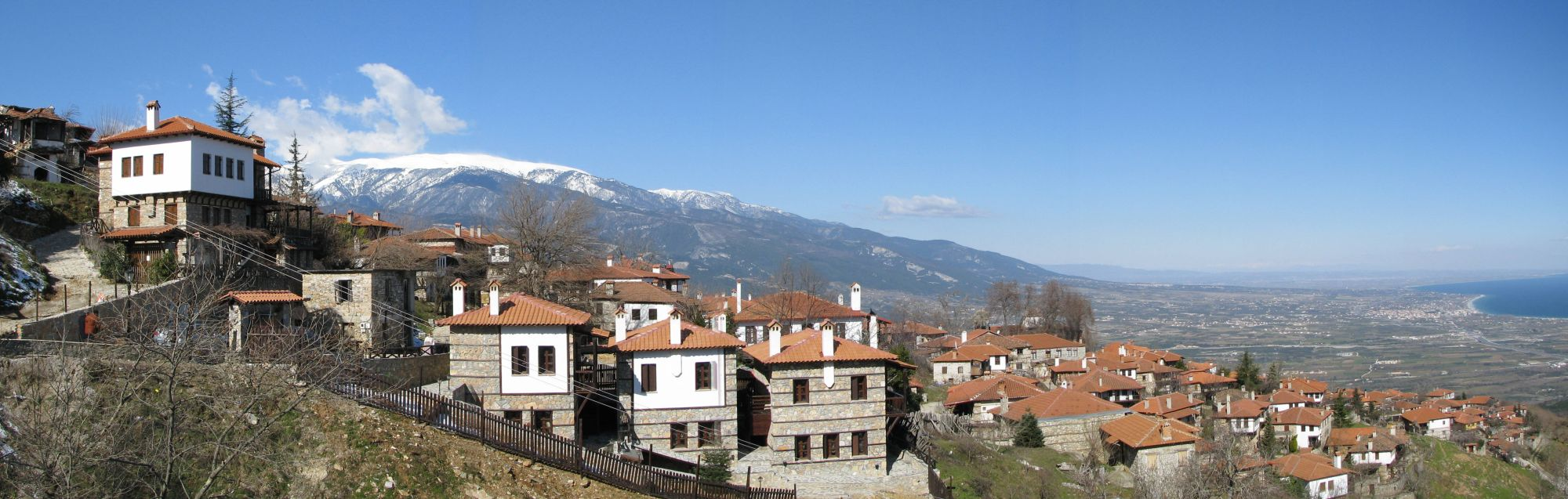
A view of Palaios Panteleimonas with Mount Olympus in the background

- List of settlements in the Pieria regional unit
