= Resort town =

Town with tourism or vacationing as a primary attraction

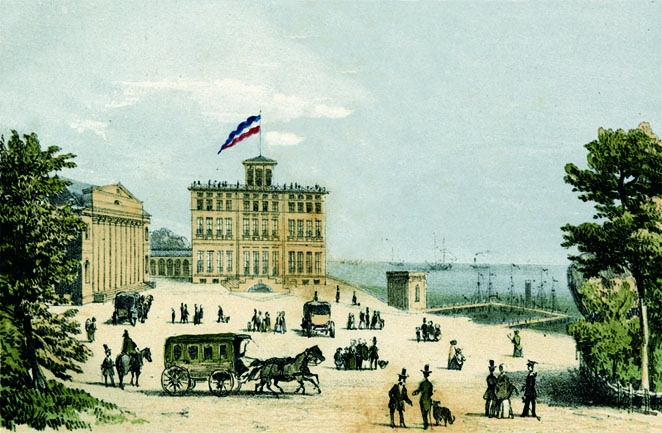
Heiligendamm in Germany, established in 1793, the oldest seaside resort in continental Europe

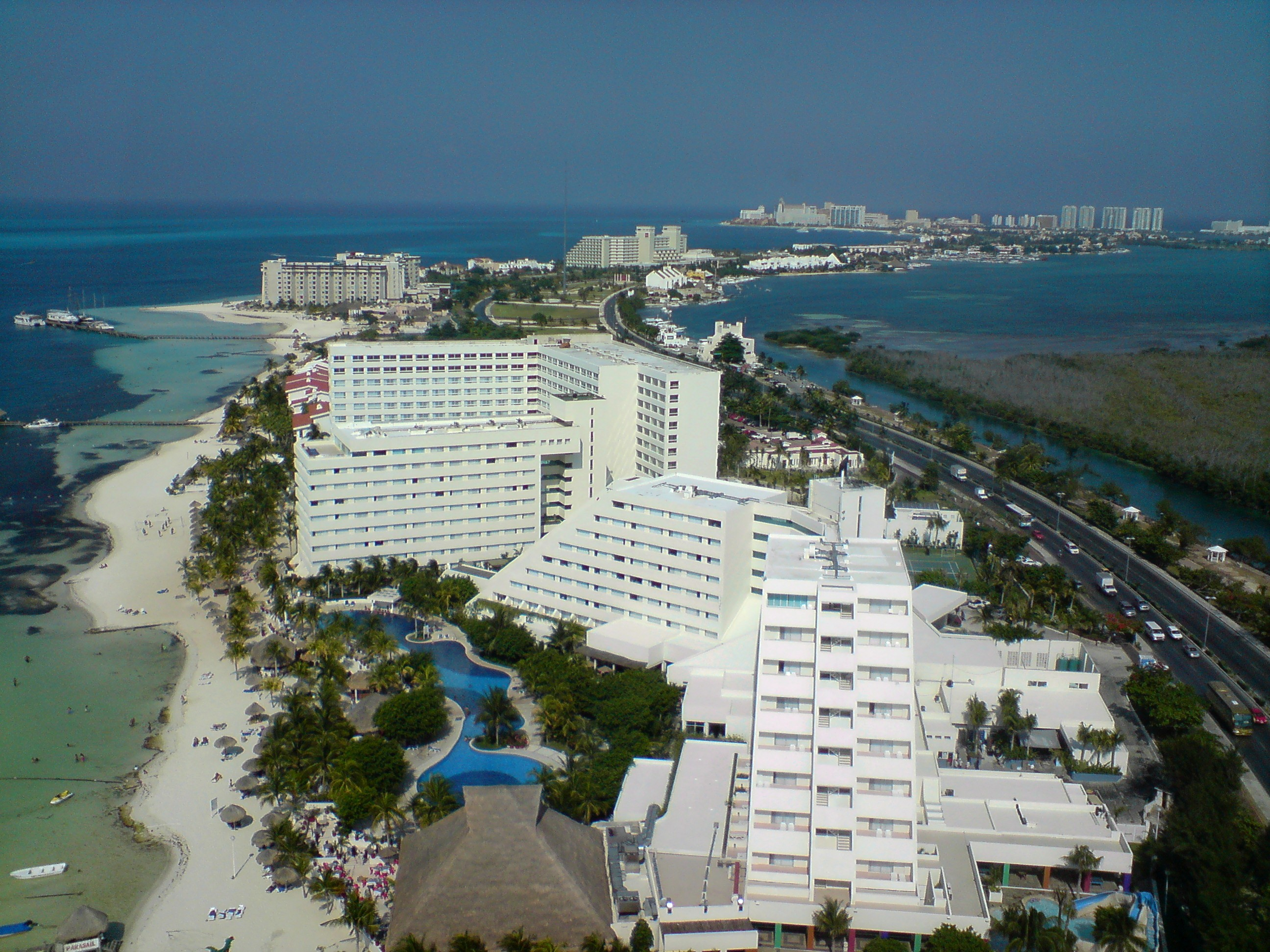
Aerial view of the Cancún Hotel Zone island, from the top of the Torre Escénicain, May 2008

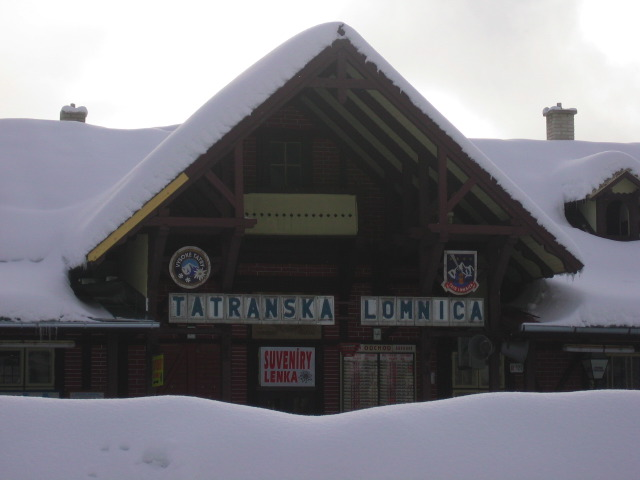
Railway station in Tatranská Lomnica ski resort, Slovakia

A resort town, resort city, or resort destination is an urban area where tourism or vacationing is the primary component of the local culture and economy. A typical resort town has one or more actual resorts in the surrounding area. Sometimes the term resort town is used simply for a locale popular among tourists. One task force in British Columbia used the definition of an incorporated or unincorporated contiguous area where the ratio of transient rooms, measured in bed units, is greater than 60% of the permanent population.

Generally, tourism is the main export in a resort town economy, with most residents of the area working in the tourism or resort industry. Shops and luxury boutiques selling locally themed souvenirs, motels, and unique restaurants often proliferate the downtown areas of a resort town.

In the case of the United States, resort towns were created around the late 1800s and early 1900s with the development of early town-making. Many resort towns feature ambitious architecture, romanticizing their location, and dependence on cheap labor.

== Resort town economy ==
If the resorts or tourist attractions are seasonal in nature (such as a ski resort), resort towns typically experience an on-season where the town is bustling with tourists and workers, and an off-season where the town is populated only by a small amount of local year-round residents.

In addition, resort towns are often popular with wealthy retirees and people wishing to purchase vacation homes, which typically drives up property values and the cost of living in the region. Sometimes, resort towns can become boomtowns due to the quick development of retirement and vacation-based residences.

However, most of the employment available in resort towns are typically low paying and it can be difficult for workers to afford to live the area in which they are employed. Many resort towns have spawned nearby bedroom communities where the majority of the resort workforce lives.

Resorts towns sometimes struggle with problems regarding sustainable growth, due to the seasonal nature of the economy, the dependence on a single industry, and the difficulties in retaining a stable workforce.

== Economic impact of tourism ==
Local residents are generally receptive of the economic impacts of tourism. Resort towns tend to enjoy lower unemployment rates, improved infrastructure, more advanced telecommunication and transportation capabilities, and higher standards of living and greater income in relation to those who live outside this area. Increased economic activity in resort towns can also have positive effects on the country's overall economic growth and development. In addition, business generated by resort towns have been credited with supporting the local economy through times of national market failure and depression.

In a study conducted by the Urban and Regional Planning Department of Istanbul Technical University, 401 local residents in the resort community of Antalya were interviewed and asked to give their opinion on the economic impacts of tourism. Among the participants, 67% had lived in Antalya for over ten years, 66% had at least a high school degree, and 30% reported jobs that were related to tourism. The results are as follows:

Perceived impact on select economic impact items

Economic Item	% Totally agree	Standard deviation
Increase in cost of land and housing	97	0.82
Increase in prices of goods and services	97	0.81
More job opportunities in Antalya	98	0.71
Better maintenance of Antalya	96	0.86
Higher standard of roads and public facilities	95	0.90
Increased income for local people	92	0.94
Better appearance of Antalya	86	1.17
More shopping opportunities	85	1.03
Increased standard of living	80	1.06
Economic gains for ordinary people	17	1.12

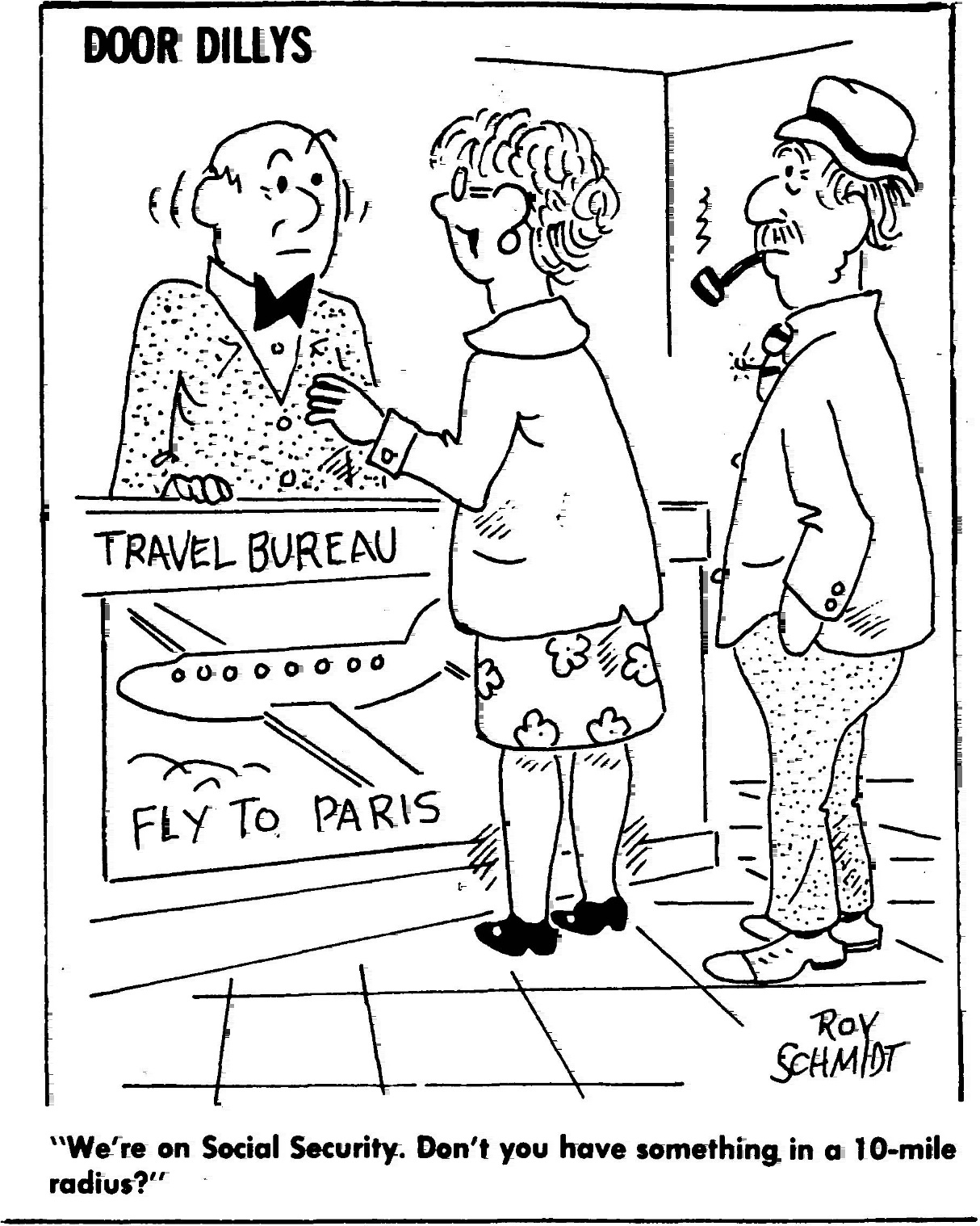
A comic drawn for a newspaper in a resort area; it depicts elderly local residents with limited income who are used to visiting attractions nearby.

More recently, resort towns have come under greater scrutiny by local communities. Instances where resort towns are poorly managed have adverse effects on the local economy. One example is the uneven distribution of income and land ownership between local residents and businesses. During tourist season, increased demand for accommodation may raise the price of land, causing a simultaneous increase in rent for local residents whose income in invariably lower than foreign residents. This results in a preponderance of foreigners in the land market and an erosion of economic opportunities for local residents.

The revenues amassed from tourism typically do not benefit the host country or the local communities. Income to local communities generated by tourism are all of the expenditures accrued after taxes, profits, and wages are paid out; however, around 80% of traveler's expenditures go to airlines, hotels, and international companies, not to local businesses. These funds are referred to as leakages. Tourism has also been blamed for other negative economic impacts to local communities. Although resort towns usually boast more improved infrastructure than surrounding areas, these developments usually present high costs to local governments and tax payers. Reallocating government funds to subsidize infrastructure and tax breaks to firms shift available funding to local education and health services. In addition, resort towns typically do not have dynamic economies, resulting in an over dependence on one industry. Economic dependence on tourism poses particular challenges to resort towns and its local residents given the seasonal nature of the job market in some areas. Local residents of resort towns face job insecurity, difficulties in obtaining training, medical-benefits, and housing.

== Examples of resort towns ==
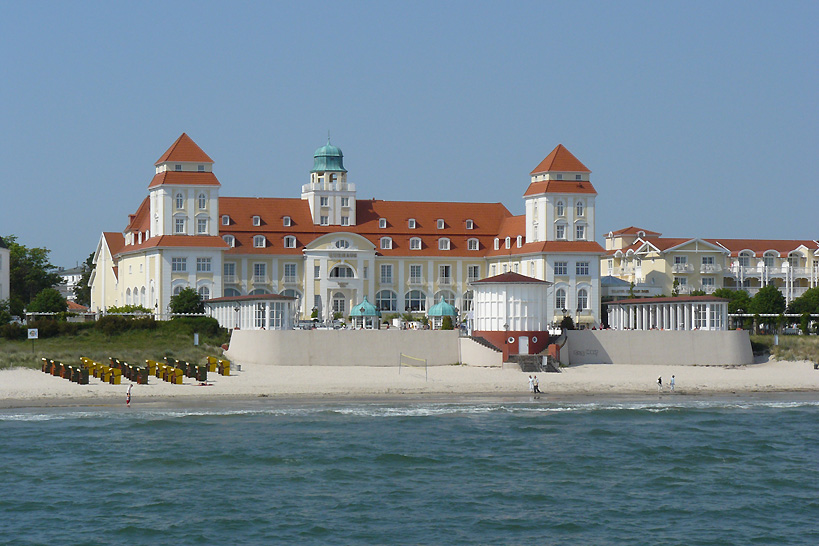
Grand Hotel Kurhaus in Resort architecture style, in Binz, Rügen (Germany)

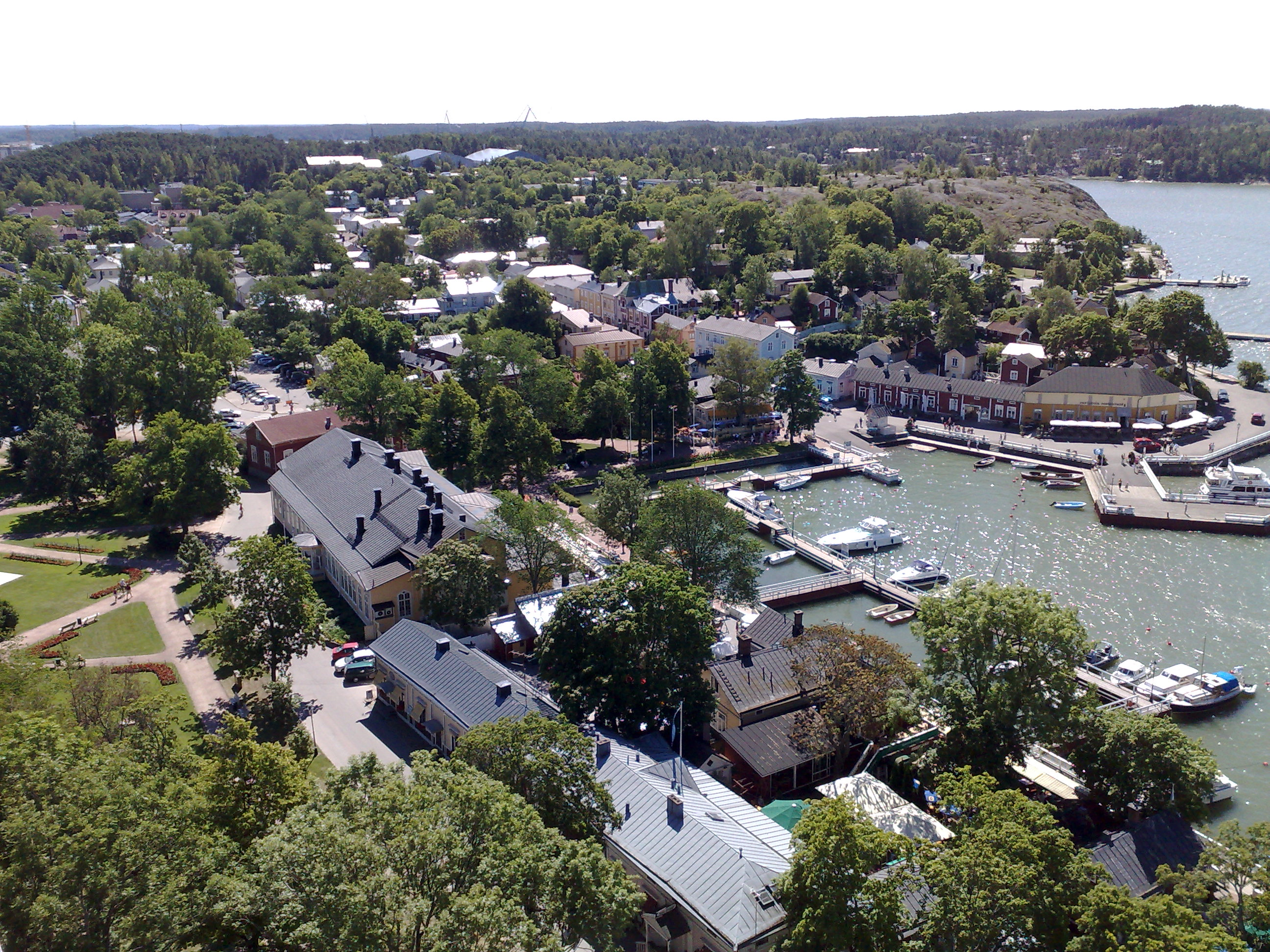
Aerial view of the Naantali summertown in Finland

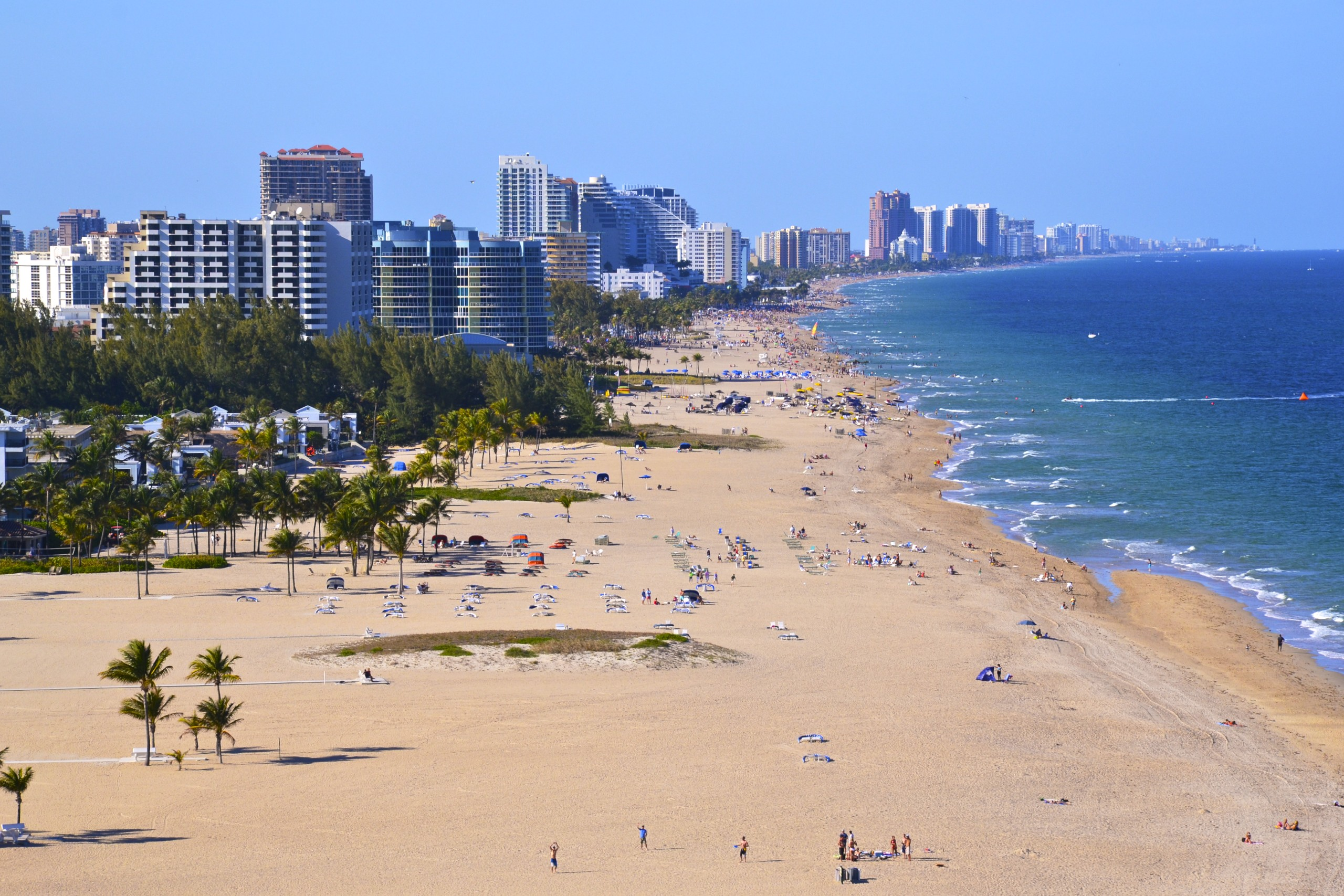
Ft. Lauderdale, Florida

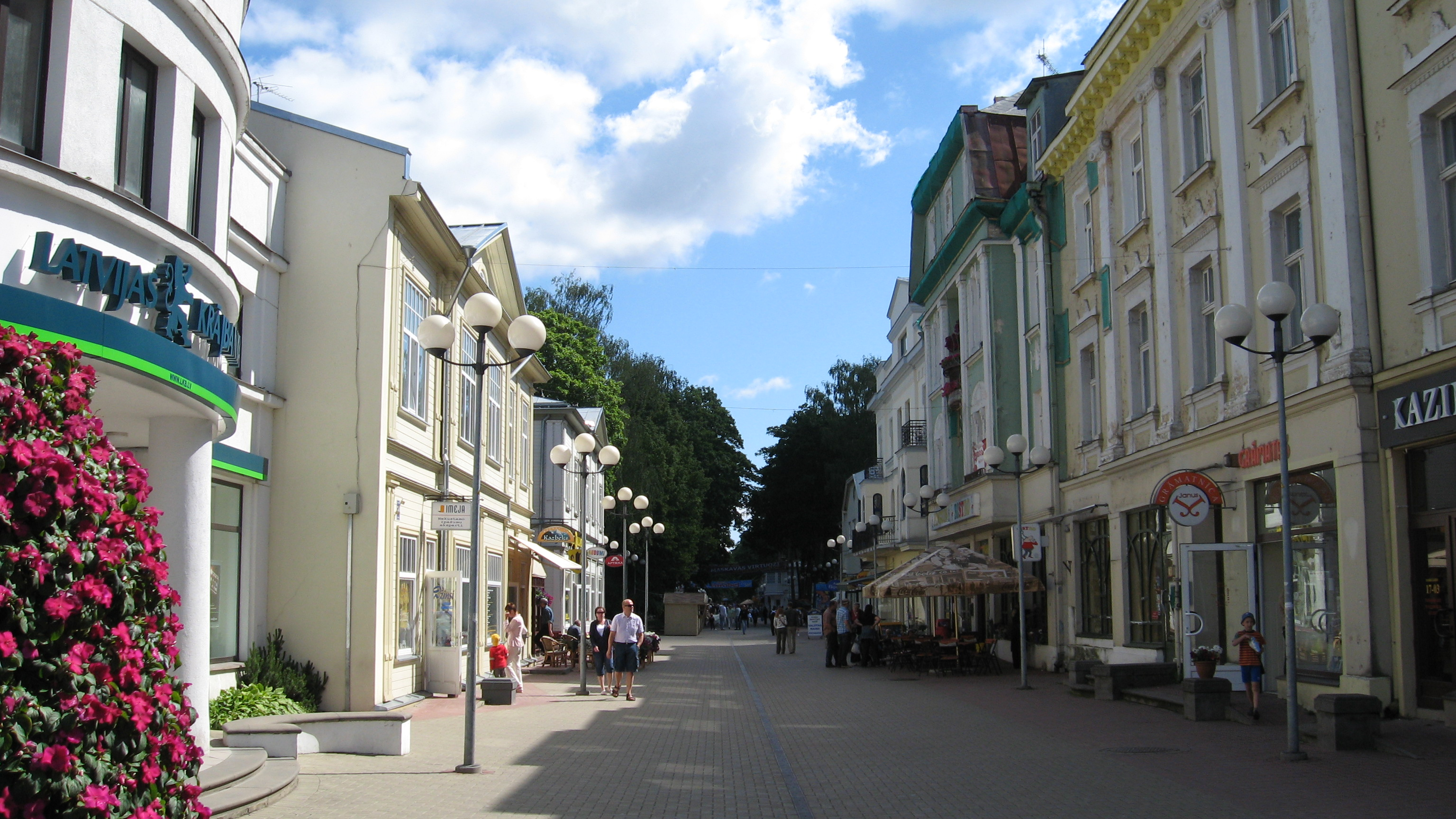
A pedestrian street in Jūrmala, Latvia

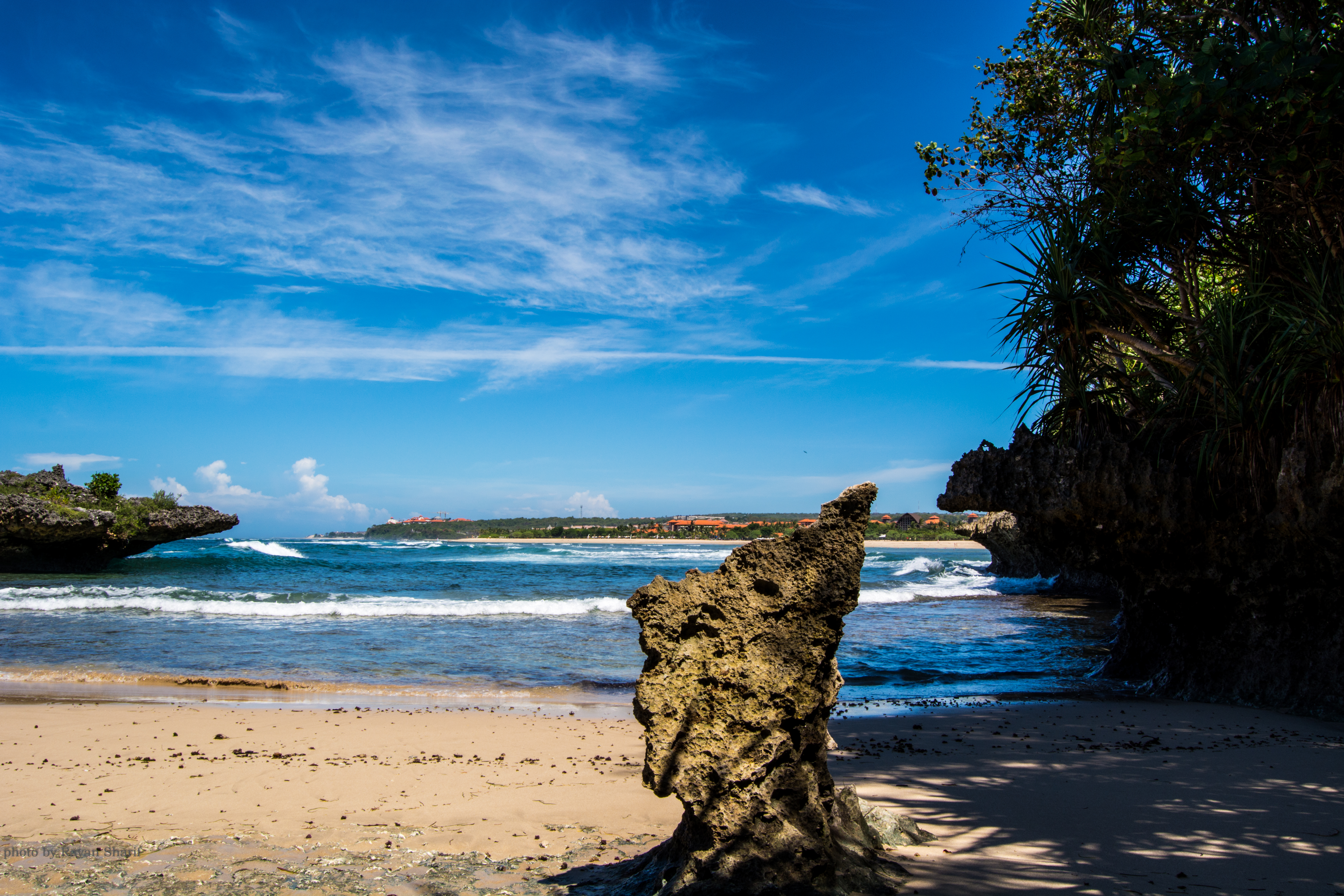
Nusa Dua in Bali, Indonesia

Examples of resort towns

- Albania
  - Durrës
  - Sarandë
  - Vlorë
- Argentina
  - Buenos Aires
  - Bariloche
  - Mar del Plata
  - Villa Gesell
- Australia
  - Cairns
  - Gold Coast
  - Daylesford
  - Hamilton Island
  - Katoomba
  - Port Douglas
  - Shoalhaven
  - Sunshine Coast
  - Thredbo
  - Yulara
- Austria
  - Innsbruck
  - Ischgl, Tirol
  - Kitzbühel, Tirol
  - St. Anton, Tirol
  - Vienna
- Azerbaijan
  - Baku
  - Mardakan
  - Nabran
  - Shaki
  - Shamakhi
  - Shahdag Mountain Resort
- Bahamas
  - Cable Beach
  - Paradise Island
- Barbados
  - Saint Lawrence Gap
- Belize
  - Caye Caulker Village
  - Placencia
  - San Pedro Town
- Belgium
  - Brussels
  - De Panne
  - Ostend
- Brazil
  - Águas de Lindóia
  - Águas de São Pedro
  - Angra dos Reis
  - Armação dos Búzios
  - Arraial do Cabo
  - Balneário Camboriú
  - Caldas Novas
  - Canoa Quebrada
  - Costa do Sauípe
  - Campos do Jordão
  - Canela
  - Fernando de Noronha
  - Florianópolis
  - Fortaleza
  - Foz do Iguaçu
  - Gramado
  - Guarujá
  - Jericoacoara
  - Maragogi
  - Olímpia
  - Paraty
  - Petrópolis
  - Poços de Caldas
  - Porto de Galinhas
  - Porto Seguro
  - Pipa Beach
  - Rio de Janeiro
  - Rio Quente
  - São Miguel dos Milagres
  - Serra Negra
  - Trancoso
- Bulgaria
  - Borovets
  - Golden Sands
  - Nesebar
  - Sunny Beach
  - Varna
- Cambodia
  - Sihanoukville
  - Siem Reap
- Canada (see also: cottage country)
  - Banff
  - Barrie
  - Canmore
  - Collingwood
  - Fernie
  - Jasper
  - Kelowna
  - Kimberley
  - Lake Cowichan
  - Lake Louise
  - Mont Tremblant
  - Niagara Falls
  - Saint Andrews
  - Tofino
  - The Blue Mountains
  - Wasaga Beach
  - Whistler
- Chile
  - Algarrobo
  - Santo Domingo
  - Pucón
  - Villarrica
  - Zapallar
- China
  - Gulangyu
  - Kuling town
  - Hainan
  - Hebei
  - Hong Kong
  - Lijiang
  - Macau
  - Sanya
  - Qingdao
  - Zhuhai
- Colombia
  - Barú Island
  - Bocagrande
  - Coveñas
  - Girardot
  - Melgar
  - Palomino
  - San Andres Island
  - Tierra Bomba Island
- Croatia
  - Biograd na Moru
  - Cres
  - Dubrovnik
  - Jablanac
  - Krk
  - Lopar
  - Omiš
  - Omišalj
  - Opatija
  - Poreč
  - Šibenik
  - Trogir
- Cuba
  - Varadero
- Cyprus
  - Ayia Napa
  - Coral Bay
  - Larnaca
  - Latchi
  - Limassol
  - Paphos
  - Pissouri
  - Polis
  - Protaras
- Czech Republic
  - Karlovy Vary
  - Staré Splavy
- Dominican Republic
  - Punta Cana
- Ecuador
  - Montañita
- Egypt
  - El Gouna
  - Giza
  - Hurghada
  - Marina
  - Sahl Hasheesh
  - Sharm el-Sheikh
  - Siwa Oasis
- Estonia
  - Haapsalu
  - Kuressaare
  - Pärnu
- Finland
  - Hanko
  - Kittilä
  - Mariehamn
  - Naantali
- France
  - Cannes
  - Ajaccio
  - Bay of Biscay
  - Sete
  - Chamonix
  - Côte d'Azur
  - Deauville
  - French Riviera
  - Nice
  - Marseille
  - Paris
- Georgia
  - Shovi
  - Bakhmaro
  - Gudauri
  - Batumi
  - Gagra
  - Kobuleti
  - Kvariati
  - New Athos
  - Pitsunda
  - Sukhumi
- Germany
  - Baden-Baden
  - Berchtesgaden
  - Binz
  - Garmisch-Partenkirchen
  - Heiligendamm
  - Heringsdorf
  - Rust
  - Rügen
  - Sassnitz
  - Sellin
  - Spiekeroog
  - Sylt
  - Warnemünde (part of Rostock)
- Greece
  - Asprovalta
  - Arachova
  - Aidipsos
  - Chalkidiki
  - Corfu
  - Elatochori
  - Hydra
  - Kamena Vourla
  - Karystos
  - Katakolo
  - Kineta
  - Kissamos
  - Kythnos
  - Laganas
  - Leptokarya
  - Litochoro
  - Loutraki
  - Malia
  - Monemvasia
  - Nafpaktos
  - Neoi Poroi
  - Olympiaki Akti
  - Parga
  - Platamon
  - Porto Cheli
  - Pylos
  - Santorini
  - Skyros
  - Syvota
- Hungary
  - Bük
  - Hévíz
- Iceland
  - Nauthólsvík
- India
  - Andaman & Nicobar Island
  - Delhi
  - Panaji
  - Gulmarg
  - Shimla
  - Manali
  - Mussoorie
  - Lakshadweep
  - Ooty
  - Puducherry
  - Alappuzha
  - Madikeri
  - Darjeeling
  - Udaipur
- Indonesia
  - Mandalika
  - Nusa Dua
  - Bali
  - Nusa Penida
  - Nusa Ceningan
  - Nusa Lembongan
  - Kuta, Bali
  - Legian
  - Seminyak
  - Belitung
  - Canggu
  - Lombok
  - Labuan Bajo
  - Manado
  - Sabang
  - Mentawai
  - Serang
  - Parangtritis
  - Bulukumba
  - Gunungkidul
  - Sumba
  - Wakatobi
- Iran
  - Kish Island
  - Qeshm Island
- Ireland
  - Bray
  - Clonakilty
  - Tramore
- Israel
  - Ashdod
  - Ashkelon
  - Ein Bokek
  - Herzliya
  - Netanya
  - Tel Aviv
  - Eilat
- Italy
  - Alba Adriatica
  - Alghero
  - Agropoli
  - Amalfi
  - Amantea
  - Anzio
  - Atrani
  - Barcola
  - Baia Domizia
  - Berchidda
  - Bibione
  - Budoni
  - Calangianus
  - Capalbio
  - Capri
  - Castel Volturno
  - Elba
  - Follonica
  - Forte dei Marmi
  - Finale Ligure
  - Fregene, Fiumicino
  - Furore
  - Gaeta
  - Gallipoli
  - Gianola - Santo Janni, Formia
  - Gioia Tauro
  - Giulianova
  - Livorno
  - Monte Argentario
  - Nettuno
  - Palau
  - Pescara
  - Polignano a Mare
  - Ponza
  - Portofino
  - Riccione
  - Rimini
  - Sanremo
  - Venice
- Jamaica
  - Negril
  - Ocho Rios
- Japan
  - Karuizawa
  - Hakone
  - Beppu
  - Atami
  - Hakuba
  - Kyoto
  - Niseko
  - Wakayama Marina City
  - Yuzawa, Niigata
- Jordan
  - Aqaba
  - Ayla Oasis
- Kenya
  - Maasai Mara
  - Malindi
  - Mombasa
- Latvia
  - Jurmala
- Lithuania
  - Birštonas
  - Druskininkai
  - Neringa
  - Palanga
- Malaysia
  - Langkawi
  - Penang
  - Pangkor
  - Cameron Highlands
  - Genting Highlands
  - Port Dickson
  - Malacca City
  - Desaru
  - Kuala Terengganu
  - Kundasang
- Malta
  - Mellieħa, St. Paul's Bay, Buġibba and Qawra
  - Sliema, St. Julian's and Paceville
  - Birżebbuġa
  - Marsascala
  - Marsalforn
  - Gozo
  - Comino
  - St. Julian's (incl. Paceville)
  - Sliema
- Mexico
  - Acapulco
  - Cabo San Lucas
  - Cancún (Hotel Zone)
  - Cozumel
  - Isla Mujeres
  - Puerto Peñasco
  - Puerto Vallarta
  - Playa del Carmen
- Morocco
  - Al Hoceima
  - Nador
  - Ifrane
  - Tangier
  - Tétouan
- New Zealand
  - Queenstown
  - Wānaka
- Nicaragua
  - San Juan del Sur
- North Macedonia
  - Mavrovo
  - Ohrid
- Norway
  - Trysil
- Pakistan
- Murree
- Bhurban
- Nathia Gali
- Ayubia
- Patriata
- Malam Jabba
- Naran
- Kaghan
- Shogran
- Kalam
- Karimabad
- Aliabad
- Skardu
- Chitral
- Ziarat
- Gorakh Hill
- Gwadar
- Paraguay
  - Encarnación
  - San Bernardino
  - Villa Florida
- Peru
  - Urubamba
  - Machupicchu Pueblo
- Philippines
  - Baguio
  - El Nido
  - Island Garden City of Samal
  - Lapu-Lapu City
  - Malay (Boracay)
  - Pagudpud
  - Panglao
  - Puerto Galera
  - Tagaytay
  - Vigan
- Poland
  - Jedlina-Zdrój
  - Krynica-Zdrój
  - Misdroy
  - Sopot
  - Zakopane
- Portugal
  - Caldas da Rainha
  - Estoril
  - Faro
  - Figueira da Foz
  - Funchal
  - Lagos
  - Quarteira
  - Madeira
- Puerto Rico
  - Ponce
  - San Juan
- Romania
  - 2 Mai
  - Constanța
  - Costinești
  - Mamaia
  - Mangalia
  - Năvodari
  - Neptun, Romania
  - Vama Veche
  - Venus, Romania
  - Sulina
  - Poiana Brașov
- Russia
  - Anapa
  - Sochi
  - Gelendzhik
  - Yalta
- Singapore
  - Sentosa
- Slovakia
  - Piešťany
  - Starý Smokovec
  - Tatranská Lomnica
- South Africa
  - Ballito
  - Langebaan
  - Plettenberg Bay
  - Port Elizabeth
  - Umhlanga
- South Korea
  - Jeju
- Spain
  - Barcelona
  - Benidorm
  - Blanes
  - Calp
  - Canary Islands
  - Dénia
  - Gran Canaria
  - Ibiza
  - Las Palmas
  - Lloret de Mar
  - Marbella
  - Tenerife
  - Torrevieja
  - Tossa de Mar
- Switzerland
  - Gstaad
  - St. Moritz
  - Verbier
- Thailand
  - Pattaya
  - Phuket
  - Hua Hin – Cha-am
  - Koh Samui
  - Chiang Mai
  - Pai
- Turkey
  - Alanya
  - Antalya
  - Bodrum
  - Didim
  - Fethiye
  - Marmaris
  - Kuşadası
  - Çeşme
- United Kingdom
  - Ayr
  - Blackpool
  - Bournemouth
  - Brighton
  - Burntisland
  - Deal, Kent
  - Girvan
  - Largs
  - Llandudno
  - Nairn
  - Rothesay
  - Saltcoats
  - Skegness
  - Southend-on-Sea
  - Southport
  - St Leonards-on-Sea
  - Torquay
  - Weston-super-Mare
- United Arab Emirates
  - Abu Dhabi
  - Dubai
- United States
  - Aspen, Colorado
  - Atlantic City, New Jersey
  - Aventura, Florida
  - Bar Harbor, Maine
  - Bay Lake, Florida
  - Big Bear Lake, California
  - Big Sky, Montana
  - Biloxi, Mississippi
  - Branson, Missouri
  - Cape May, New Jersey
  - Carlsbad, California
  - Cloudcroft, New Mexico
  - Cody, Wyoming
  - Coronado, California
  - Daytona Beach, Florida
  - Deal, New Jersey
  - Destin, Florida
  - Eagle Nest, New Mexico
  - East Hampton, New York
  - Eatontown, New Jersey
  - Edgartown, Massachusetts
  - Elberon, New Jersey
  - Eureka Springs, Arkansas
  - Fire Island, New York
  - Fairbanks, Alaska
  - Fish Creek, Wisconsin (Door County)
  - Flagstaff, Arizona
  - Galveston, Texas
  - Gatlinburg, Tennessee
  - Geneva, Illinois
  - Gettysburg, Pennsylvania
  - Glenwood Springs, Colorado
  - Grand Canyon Village, Arizona
  - Gulf Shores, Alabama
  - Hershey, Pennsylvania
  - Highlands, North Carolina
  - Hilo, Hawaii
  - Hilton Head Island, South Carolina
  - Hot Springs, Arkansas
  - Honolulu, Hawaii
  - Incline Village, Nevada
  - Jackson, Wyoming
  - Jacksonville Beach, Florida
  - Jekyll Island, Georgia
  - Juneau, Alaska
  - Kailua-Kona, Hawaii
  - Kennebunkport, Maine
  - Ketchikan, Alaska
  - Keystone, South Dakota
  - Key West, Florida
  - Laguna Beach, California
  - Lake Buena Vista, Florida
  - Lake Geneva, Wisconsin
  - Lake George, New York
  - Lake Havasu City, Arizona
  - Lake Placid, New York
  - Lahaina, Hawaii
  - Las Vegas, Nevada
  - Laughlin, Nevada
  - Loch Arbour, New Jersey
  - Long Beach, California
  - Long Branch, New Jersey
  - Mackinac Island, Michigan
  - Mackinaw City, Michigan
  - Mammoth, Wyoming
  - Mammoth Lakes, California
  - Marathon, Texas
  - Marco Island, Florida
  - Marfa, Texas
  - Martha's Vineyard, Massachusetts
  - Medicine Park, Oklahoma
  - Miami, Florida
  - Miami Beach, Florida
  - Moab, Utah
  - Montauk, New York
  - Monterey Bay, California
  - Myrtle Beach, South Carolina
  - Mystic, Connecticut
  - Nahant, Massachusetts
  - Nantucket, Massachusetts
  - Naples, Florida
  - New Orleans, Louisiana
  - Newport, Rhode Island
  - New Smyrna Beach, Florida
  - Niagara Falls, New York
  - Oak Bluffs, Massachusetts
  - Ocean Beach, New York
  - Ocean City, Maryland
  - Ocean City, New Jersey
  - Ocean Park, Maine
  - Orange Beach, Alabama
  - Oregon, Illinois
  - Orlando, Florida
  - Ogunquit, Maine
  - Old Orchard Beach, Maine
  - Page, Arizona
  - Palm Beach, Florida
  - Palm Springs, California
  - Pinehurst, North Carolina
  - Panama City Beach, Florida
  - Paradise, Nevada
  - Park City, Utah
  - Pigeon Forge, Tennessee
  - Provincetown, Massachusetts
  - Put-In-Bay, Ohio
  - Punxsutawney, Pennsylvania
  - Rachel, Nevada
  - Red River, New Mexico
  - Rehoboth Beach, Delaware
  - Rhyolite, Nevada
  - Ruidoso, New Mexico
  - Sandusky, Ohio
  - Santa Barbara, California
  - Santa Claus, Indiana
  - Santa Cruz, California
  - Santa Fe, New Mexico
  - Santa Monica, California
  - Saint George, Utah
  - Saint Simons Island, Georgia
  - Savannah, Georgia
  - Scottsdale, Arizona
  - Seabrook, Washington
  - Sedona, Arizona
  - Sedro-Woolley, Washington
  - Sevierville, Tennessee
  - Seward, Alaska
  - Sitka, Alaska
  - Skagway, Alaska
  - Southampton, New York
  - South Lake Tahoe, California
  - South Padre Island, Texas
  - Spearfish, South Dakota
  - Steamboat Springs, Colorado
  - Stehekin, Washington
  - Stowe, Vermont
  - Sunny Isles, Florida
  - Sun Valley, Idaho
  - Talkeetna, Alaska
  - Taos, New Mexico
  - Terlingua, Texas
  - Tonopah, Nevada
  - Traverse City, Michigan
  - Tybee Island, Georgia
  - Utica, Illinois
  - Vail, Colorado
  - Vincennes, Indiana
  - Virginia Beach, Virginia
  - Virginia City, Nevada
  - Wells, Maine
  - West Baden Springs, Indiana
  - West Yellowstone, Montana
  - Whitefish, Montana
  - Wildwood, New Jersey
  - Williams, Arizona
  - Williamsburg, Virginia
  - Winchester, Nevada
  - Wisconsin Dells, Wisconsin
  - Woodland Park, Colorado
  - Wrightsville Beach, North Carolina
  - Wrightwood, California
  - York Beach, Maine
- Ukraine
  - Odesa
- Uruguay
  - Atlántida
  - La Paloma
  - Punta del Este
  - Piriápolis
- Vietnam
  - Phan Thiết
  - Vũng Tàu
  - Hội An
  - Hạ Long
  - Nha Trang

== See also ==
- Cottage country
- Holiday village
- Tourist attraction
- Tourism region
- Hill station
- Tourist city
