= Palaios Panteleimonas =

Mountain village in Greece

Coordinates: 39°59′31″N 22°34′18″E

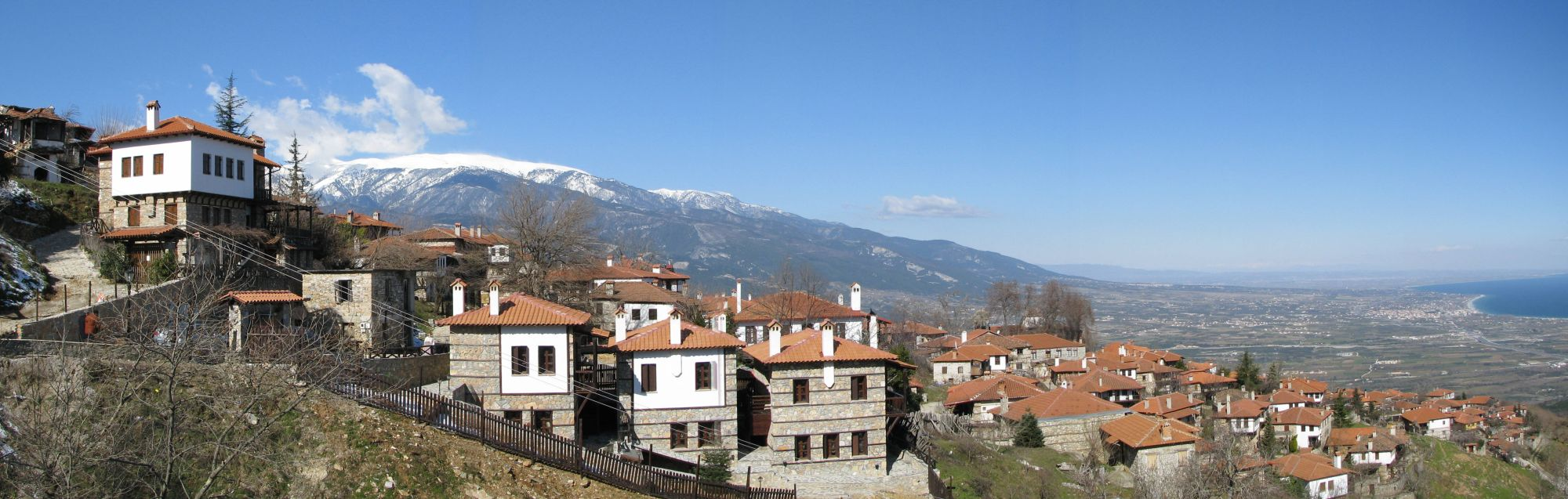
View of Palios Panteleimonas.

Palaios Panteleimonas (Greek: Παλαιός Παντελεήμονας) is a mountain village of the former municipality of East Olympos, which is part of the municipality of Dio-Olympos, in the Pieria regional unit, Central Macedonia, Greece.

Palaios Panteleimonas is located 43 km from Katerini and it is just 6 km from the village and beach of Neos Panteleimonas, where there are also many possibilities for accommodation, dining, entertainment and tourist information. The view of the Thermaikos Gulf from the area is unique. The path to the village and the surrounding area is rich of fauna of the lower Mount Olympus, with forest of chestnut, oak and arbutus. You can also watch the summer of cultural events of the International Olympus Festival of Castle of Platamon.

The nearest railway station is Neoi Poroi on the Thessaloniki Regional Railway: the village is also served by Pieria Provincial Road 9, which leads to the EO1 road and the A1 motorway.

== Nearest places ==
- Neos Panteleimonas
- Beach of Panteleimon
- Neoi Poroi
- Platamon

== See also ==
- Castle of Platamon
