= East Olympos =

East Olympos Ανατολικός Όλυμπος
- Municipal unit
- Location within the regional unit

- Location within Greece
- Coordinates: 40°04′N 22°34′E
- Country: Greece
- Administrative region: Central Macedonia
- Regional unit: Pieria
- Municipality: Dion-Olympos

Area
  - Municipal unit: 152.939 km^{2} (59.050 sq mi)

Population (2021)
  - Municipal unit: 7,999
  - Municipal unit density: 52.30/km^{2} (135.5/sq mi)
- Time zone: UTC+2 (EET)
  - Summer (DST): UTC+3 (EEST)
- Vehicle registration: KN

East Olympos, or Anatolikos Olympos (Greek: Ανατολικός Όλυμπος, Anatolikós Ólympos, lit. 'east Olympos'), is a former municipality in Pieria regional unit, Greece. In Greece's 2011 local government reform East Olympos became a municipal unit of the municipality Dion-Olympos. The municipal unit has an area of 152.939 km^{2} (59.050 mi^{2}) and a population of 7,999 (2021). The seat of the former East Olympos municipality was in Leptokarya.

The current East Olympos municipal unit consists of the following communities (constituent villages in parentheses):

- Leptokarya
- Panteleimonas (Palaios Panteleimonas, Neos Panteleimonas, Paralia Panteleimonos)
- Platamon
- Poroi (Neoi Poroi, Agios Dimitrios, Poroi)
- Skotina (Skotina, Ano Skotina, Paralia Skotinis)
