= Neoi Poroi =

Neoi Poroi Νέοι Πόροι
- Settlement
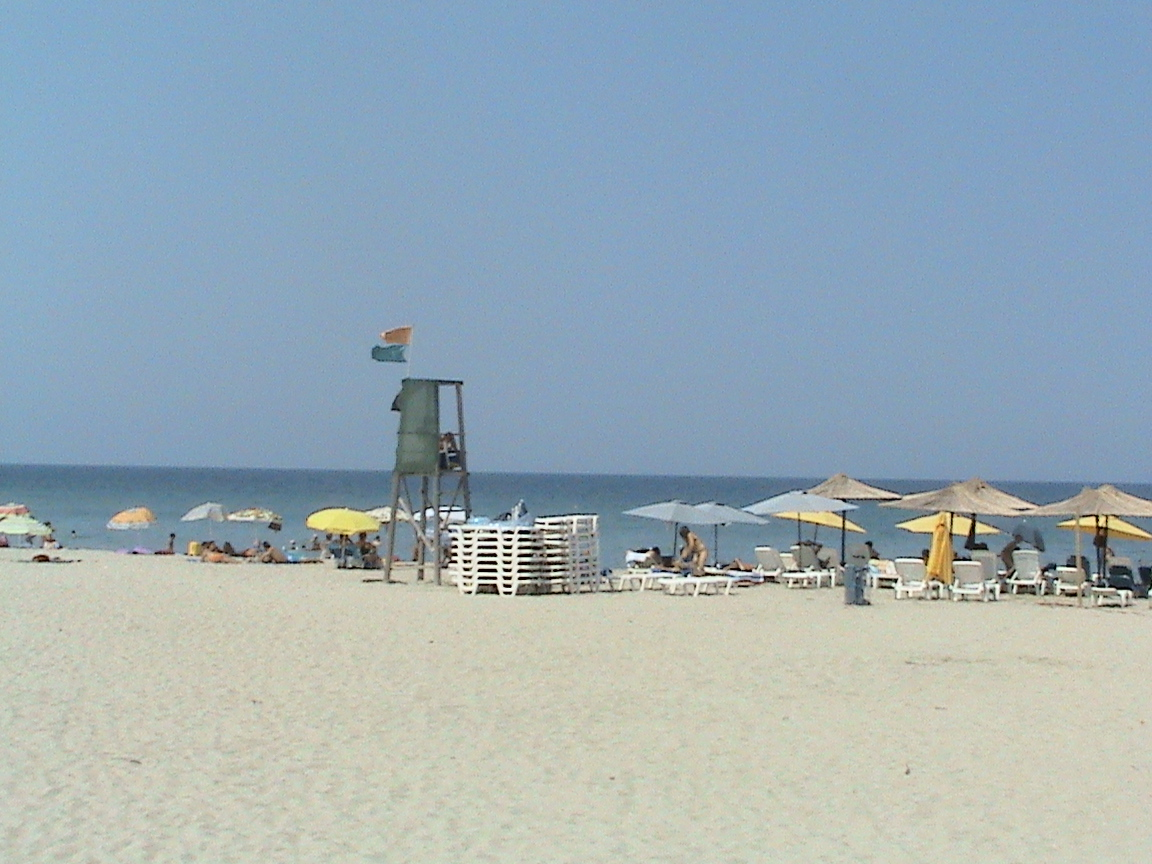
- The beach of Neoi Poroi

- Location within Greece
- Coordinates: 39°59′N 22°39′E
- Country: Greece
- Administrative region: Central Macedonia
- Regional unit: Pieria
- Municipality: Dio-Olympos
- Municipal unit: East Olympos
- Community: Poroi
- Elevation: 5 m (16 ft)

Population (2021)
  - Total: 716
- Time zone: UTC+2 (EET)
  - Summer (DST): UTC+3 (EEST)
- Postal code: 600 65
- Area code: +30-2352
- Vehicle registration: KN

Neoi Poroi (Greek: Νέοι Πόροι [ˈnei ˈpoɾi]) is a coastal village of the Dio-Olympos municipality. Before the 2011 local government reform it was part of the municipality of East Olympos. The settlement of Neoi Poroi had a population of 716 inhabitants as of 2021. Neoi Poroi is a part of the community of Poroi. The main occupation in the village is tourism. A model development plan, has wide streets and squares.

== Geography ==
The village is located on the southernmost coast of Pieria, near the traditional village of "Παλαιοί Πόροι", Paleoi Poroi and the vast and scenic wetlands in the northern part of Pineios.

== Transport ==
The village is served by a railway station, with both Intercity trains and Proastiakos services to Thessaloniki.

== Persons ==
- Matthias Laurenz Gräff (* 1984), austrian painter, historian, political activist, representative of the Austrian parliamentary party NEOS in Greece and throughout Cyprus. He lives in Platamonas-Neoi Pori.

== Nearest places ==
- Platamon, north
- Beach of Panteleimon, north
- Neos Panteleimonas, north
- Palios Panteleimonas, west
- Beach of Skotina, north
- Aigani, west
- Kastri-Loutro, south
- Nea Mesangala, south

== See also ==
- Castle of Platamon
- List of settlements in the Pieria regional unit
