= Ano Skotina =

Coordinates: 39°59′35″N 22°32′00″E

Ano Skotina (Greek: Άνω Σκοτίνα) is an old settlement of the prefecture of Pieria. It is built on an altitude of 600 m on the southeastern side of Mount Olympus.

It has hotels, taverns, restaurants, and offers every form of alternative tourism like mountain riding, climbing, hiking etc. Cultural events of the settlement is the celebration of the Church of the Dormition of the Theotokos (Κοίμηση της Θεοτόκου), every year on August 15.

== See also ==
- Skotina
- Beach of Skotina
