= Agios Dimitrios, Dio-Olympos =

Agios Dimitrios Άγιος Δημήτριος
- Settlement
- Location within Greece
- Coordinates: 39°58.7′N 22°37.2′E
- Country: Greece
- Administrative region: Central Macedonia
- Regional unit: Pieria
- Municipality: Dio-Olympos
- Municipal unit: East Olympos
- Community: Poroi
- Elevation: 45 m (148 ft)

Population (2021)
  - Total: 12
- Time zone: UTC+2 (EET)
  - Summer (DST): UTC+3 (EEST)
- Postal code: 600 65
- Area code: +30-2352
- Vehicle registration: KN

Agios Dimitrios (Greek: Άγιος Δημήτριος) is a village of the Dio-Olympos municipality. Before the 2011 local government reform it was part of the municipality of East Olympos. The 2021 census recorded 12 inhabitants in the village. Agios Dimitrios is a part of the community of Poroi.

== See also ==
- List of settlements in the Pieria regional unit
