= Neos Panteleimonas =

Settlement in Central Macedonia, Greece

Coordinates: 40°00′11″N 22°35′39″E

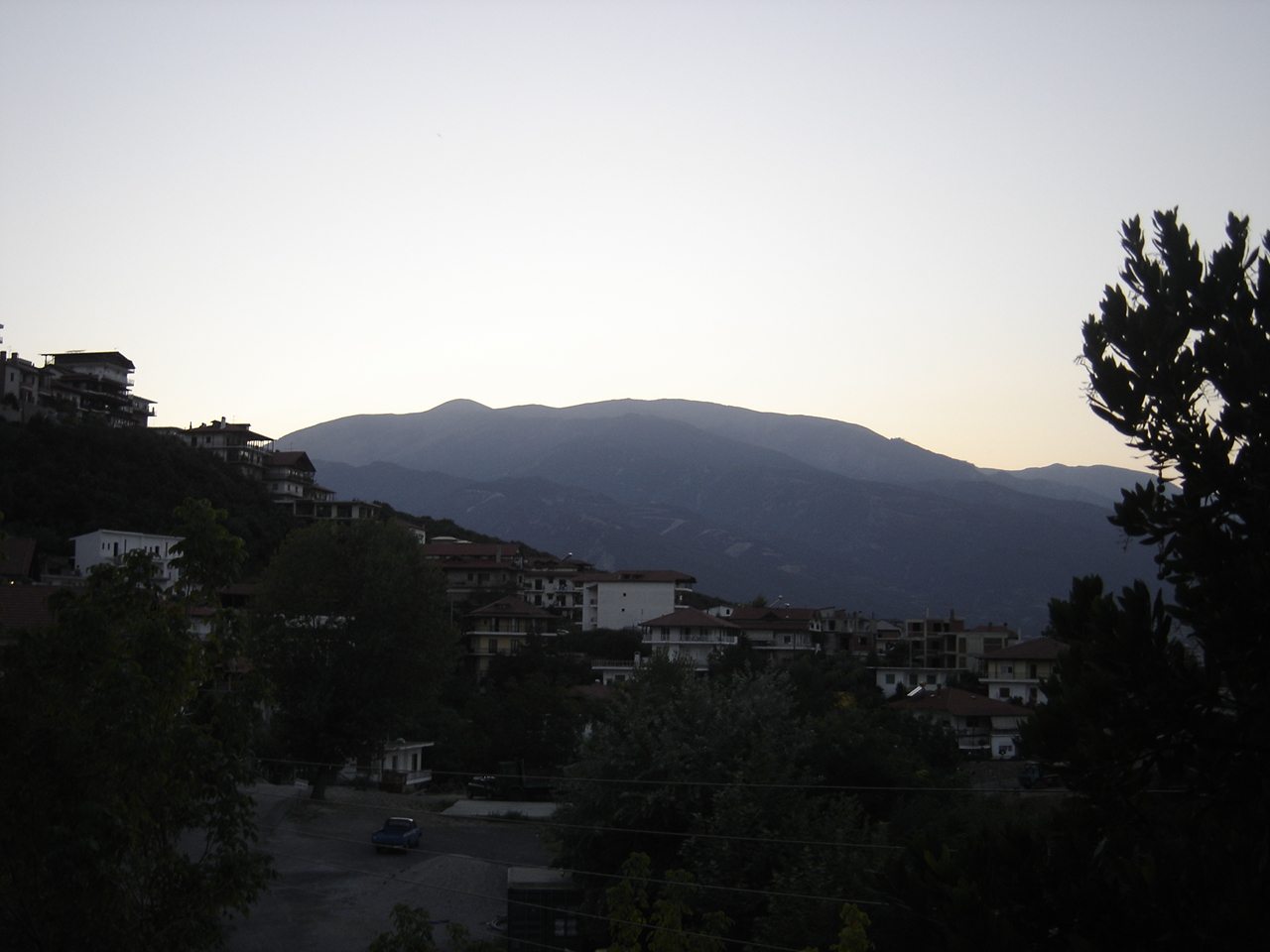
View of Neos Panteleimonas, with the Olympus in the background.

Neos Panteleimonas (Greek: Νέος Παντελεήμονας) is a settlement of the former municipality of East Olympos, which is part of the municipality of Dio-Olympos, in the Pieria regional unit, Central Macedonia, Greece.

Neos Panteleimonas is a settlement built on the foothills of Mount Olympos by the seaside. Its privileged region offers endless view to the sea and the Castle of Platamon. By car, the Old Panteleimon is 400 km from Athens and 110 km from Thessaloniki. It is worth visiting the museum and the archeological site of Dion.

== Nearest places ==
- Palios Panteleimonas
- Beach of Panteleimon
- Platamon
- Neoi Poroi

== See also ==
- Castle of Platamon
