= Leptokarya =

Leptokarya Λεπτοκαρυά
- Community
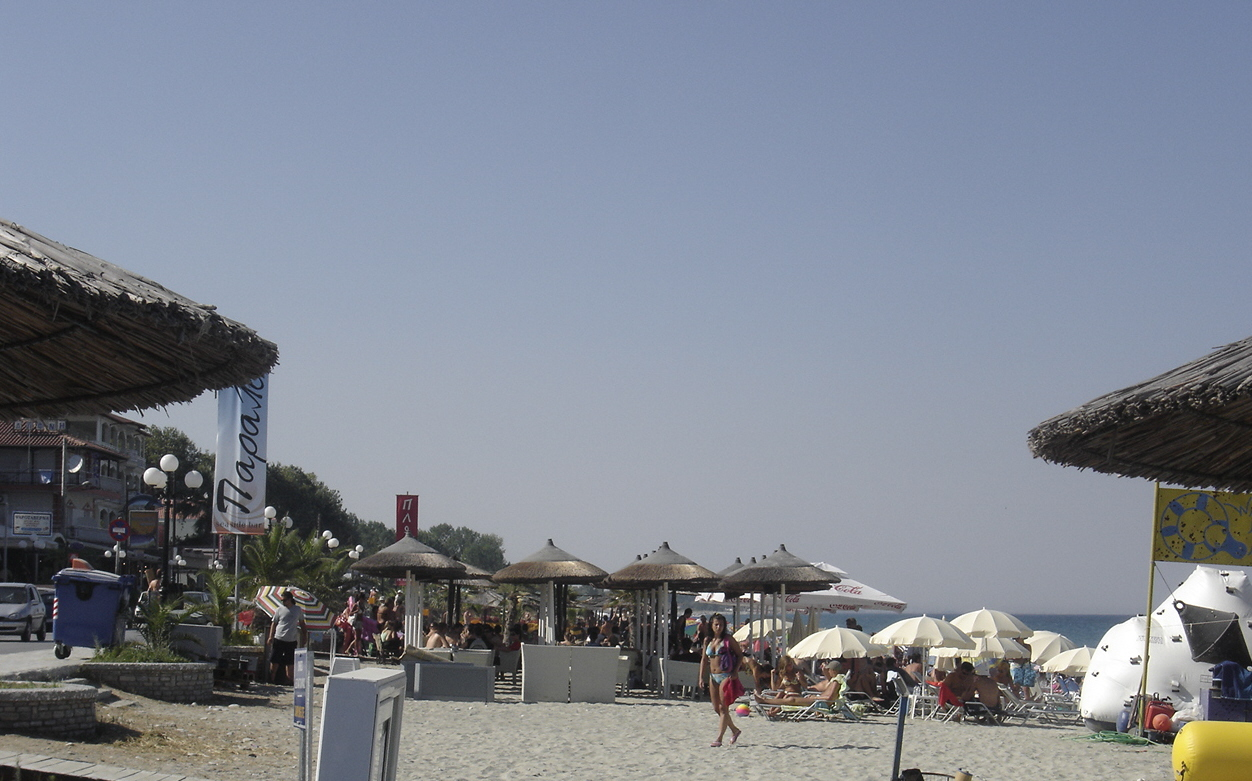
- Beach of Leptokarya

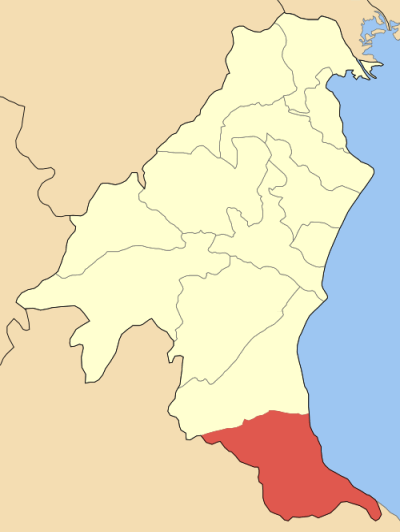
- Location within the regional unit

- Location within Greece
- Coordinates: 40°04′N 22°34′E
- Country: Greece
- Administrative region: Central Macedonia
- Regional unit: Pieria
- Municipality: Dion-Olympos
- Municipal unit: East Olympos

Area
  - Community: 66.4 km^{2} (25.6 sq mi)
- Elevation: 30 m (98 ft)

Population (2021)
  - Community: 3,612
  - Density: 54.4/km^{2} (141/sq mi)
- Time zone: UTC+2 (EET)
  - Summer (DST): UTC+3 (EEST)
- Postal code: 600 63
- Area code: 23520
- Vehicle registration: KN

Leptokarya (Greek: Λεπτοκαρυά, Leptokarya) is a town in Pieria regional unit, Central Macedonia, Greece, former seat of East Olympos municipality, which is part of the municipality of Dion-Olympos. The distance from Katerini is 26 km and the population of the village was 3,612 inhabitants as of 2021.

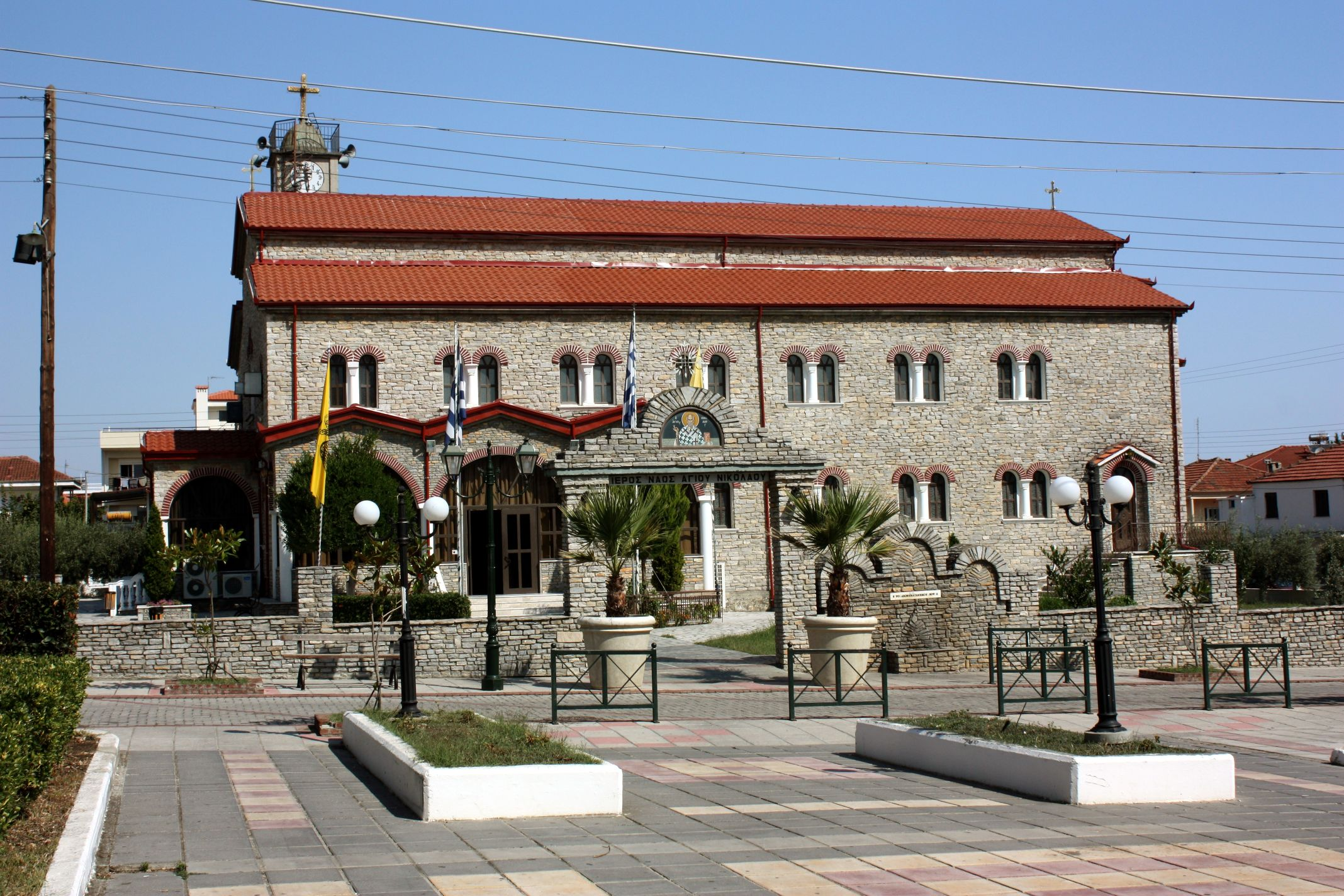
Saint Nicholas church

== Location ==
Lies on the coast of Aegean Sea, under the Mount Olympos. It is located near ancient Leivithra, allegedly the home of Orpheus, major figure in the Greek Mythology. Since the major events and customs in the town is the revival of division of Orpheus.

== Tourism ==
Leptokarya is a popular tourist destination during the summer months due to its beaches, as well as due to its proximity to Mount Olympus. The town houses Olympus Geological History Museum dedicated to the geology of the surrounding area.

== Transport ==
The town is served by Leptokarya train station, with local stopping services to Thessaloniki, Kalambaka and Palaiofarsalos, and since 2008, by Proastiakos Thessaloniki to Larissa and Thessaloniki.

== See also ==
- List of settlements in the Pieria regional unit
- Platamon

== Notes ==
- Καζταρίδη Ι. Φ., Η Πιερία των περιηγητών και των γεωγράφων
