= Poroi =

Poroi Πόροι
- Community
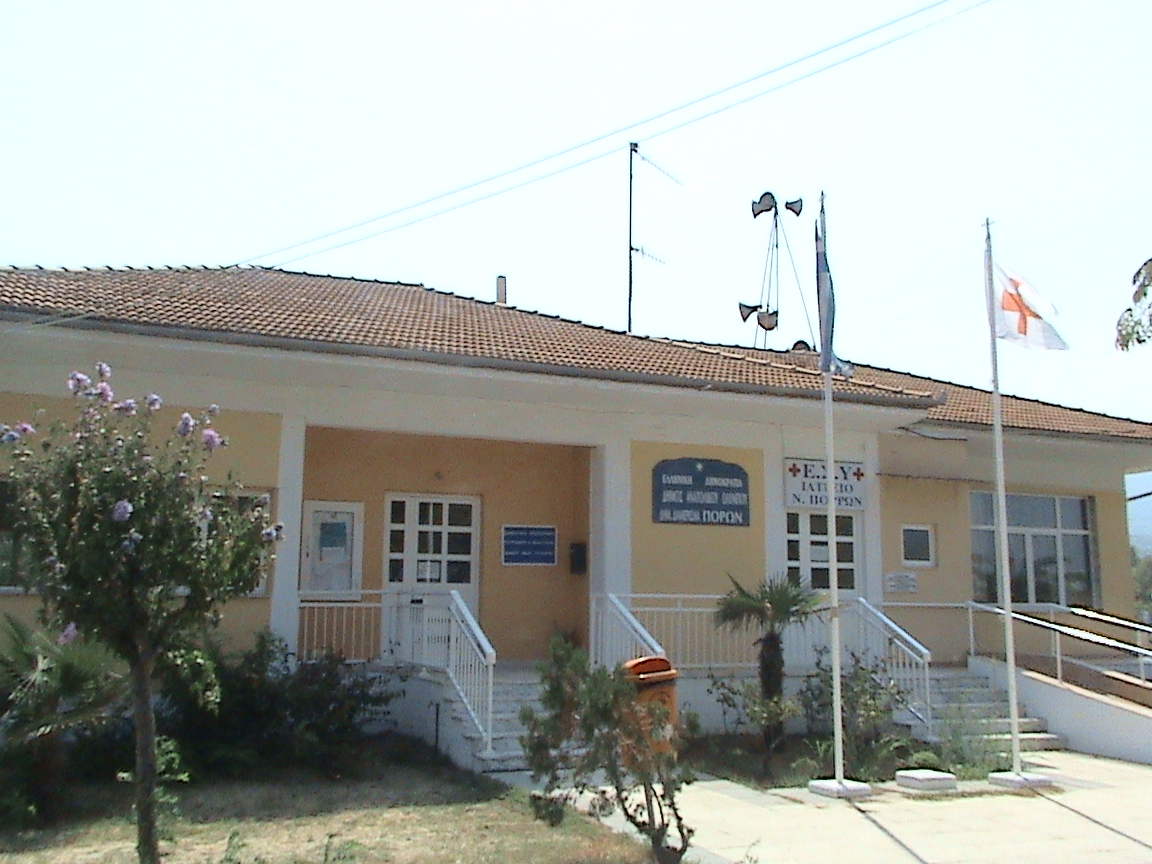
- The community hall of Poroi

- Location within Greece
- Coordinates: 39°58.651′N 22°39′E
- Country: Greece
- Administrative region: Central Macedonia
- Regional unit: Pieria
- Municipality: Dio-Olympos
- Municipal unit: East Olympos

Area
  - Community: 26.889 km^{2} (10.382 sq mi)
- Elevation: 23 m (75 ft)

Population (2021)
  - Community: 751
  - Density: 27.9/km^{2} (72.3/sq mi)
- Time zone: UTC+2 (EET)
  - Summer (DST): UTC+3 (EEST)
- Postal code: 600 65
- Area code: +30-2352
- Vehicle registration: KN

Poroi (Greek: Πόροι) is a village and a community of the Dio-Olympos municipality. Before the 2011 local government reform it was part of the municipality of East Olympos, of which it was a municipal district. The 2021 census recorded 751 inhabitants in the community. The community of Poroi covers an area of 26.889 km^{2}.

== Administrative division ==
The community of Poroi consists of three separate settlements:

- Agios Dimitrios (population 12 as of 2021)
- Neoi Poroi (population 716)
- Poroi (population 23)

== Village ==
The village Poroi (also Palaioi Poroi, to distinguish it from the larger Neoi Poroi) is a small mountain village with 23 inhabitants (2011). Author, member of the Filiki Eteria, and officer in the Greek War of Independence Christoforos Perraivos was born here. The village of Poroi contains numerous religious sites within the community. These include the chapels of St. Nikolaos and St. Dimitrios.

== See also ==
- List of settlements in the Pieria regional unit
