= Paralia Skotinas =

Coordinates: 40°02′N 22°35′E

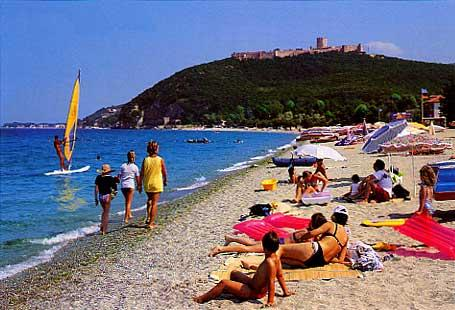
The beach of Skotina, with a view of the Castle of Platamon

Paralia Skotinas (Greek: Παραλία Σκοτίνας) is a seaside settlement which is part of the municipality of Dio-Olympos, in the Pieria regional unit, Central Macedonia, Greece. It is 6 κm from Leptokarya, 1 km from Paralia Panteleimonos (Castle) and 1κm from Skotina. In this point its view of the Castle of Platamon, is unique.
