= Skotina =

Skotina Σκοτίνα
- Community
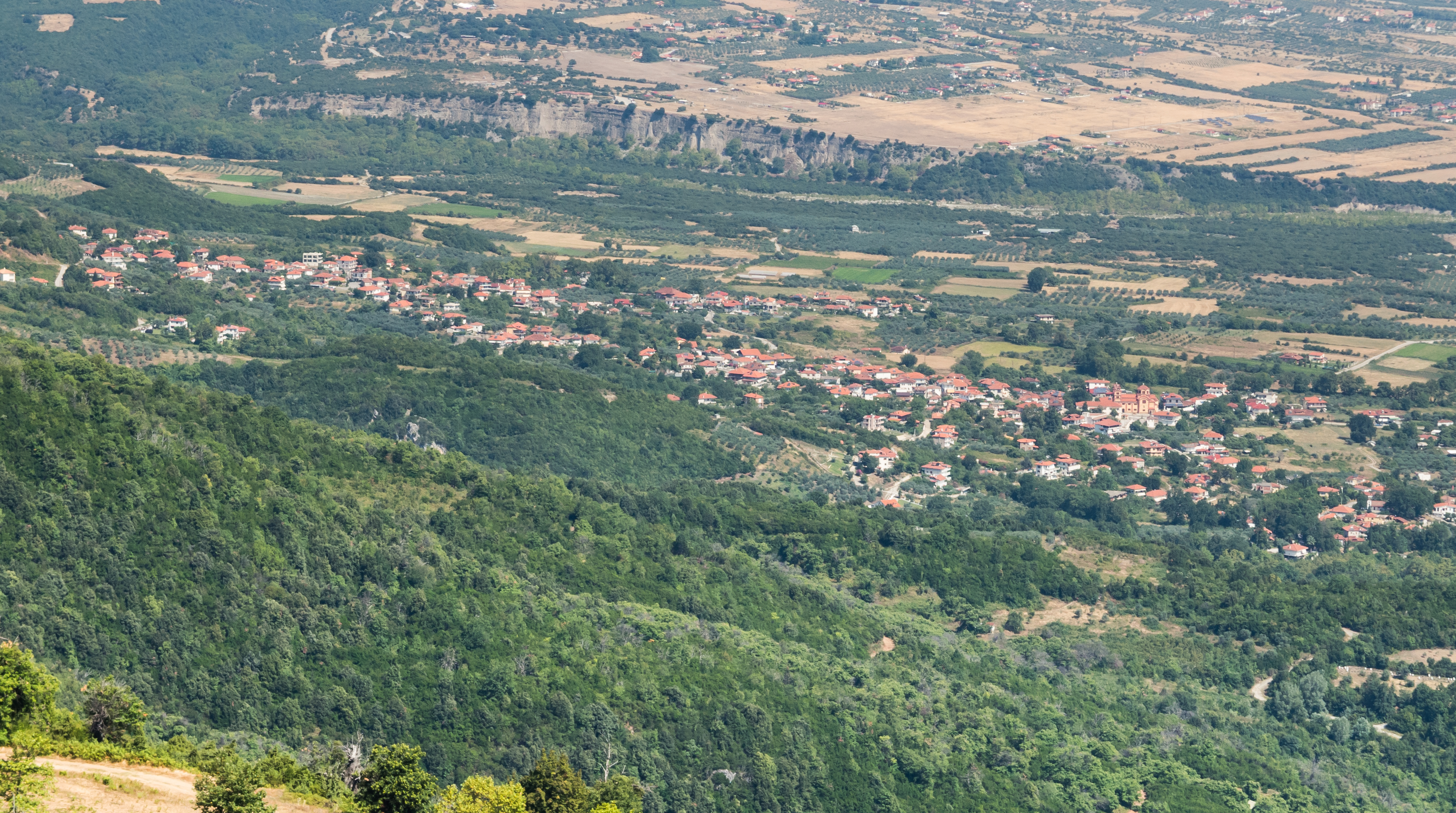
- View of Skotina from south

- Location within Greece
- Coordinates: 40°01′N 22°33′E
- Country: Greece
- Administrative region: Central Macedonia
- Regional unit: Pieria
- Municipality: Dio-Olympos
- Municipal unit: East Olympos

Population (2021)
  - Community: 857
- Time zone: UTC+2 (EET)
  - Summer (DST): UTC+3 (EEST)
- Postal code: 600 63
- Area code: 23520
- Vehicle registration: KN

Skotina (Greek: Σκοτίνα) is a rural settlement of the former municipality of East Olympos, itself part of the municipality of Dion-Olympos, in the Pieria regional unit, Central Macedonia, Greece.

== Name ==
The name is taken due to handmade costumes (woolen fabrics, handmade costumes), which were made in the region that made the cloaks and the sails for sailing ships of the era.

== Geography ==
The village is built on the southeastern edge of the mount Olympus, 32 km from the city of Katerini, and has a view towards the Thermaic Gulf. Ancient places nearby are Herakleion (4 km) and Leivithra (2 km).

== Population ==
The community of Skotina had a population 857 inhabitants as of 2021. The community consists of the settlements of Skotina, Paralia Skotinas and the nowadays uninhabited Palia Skotina.

== Notes ==
- Encyclopedia Μαλλιάρης- Παιδεία, Volume 24, p. 27.
