= Neoi Poroi railway station =

Greek railway station

Νέοι Πόροι Neoi Poroi
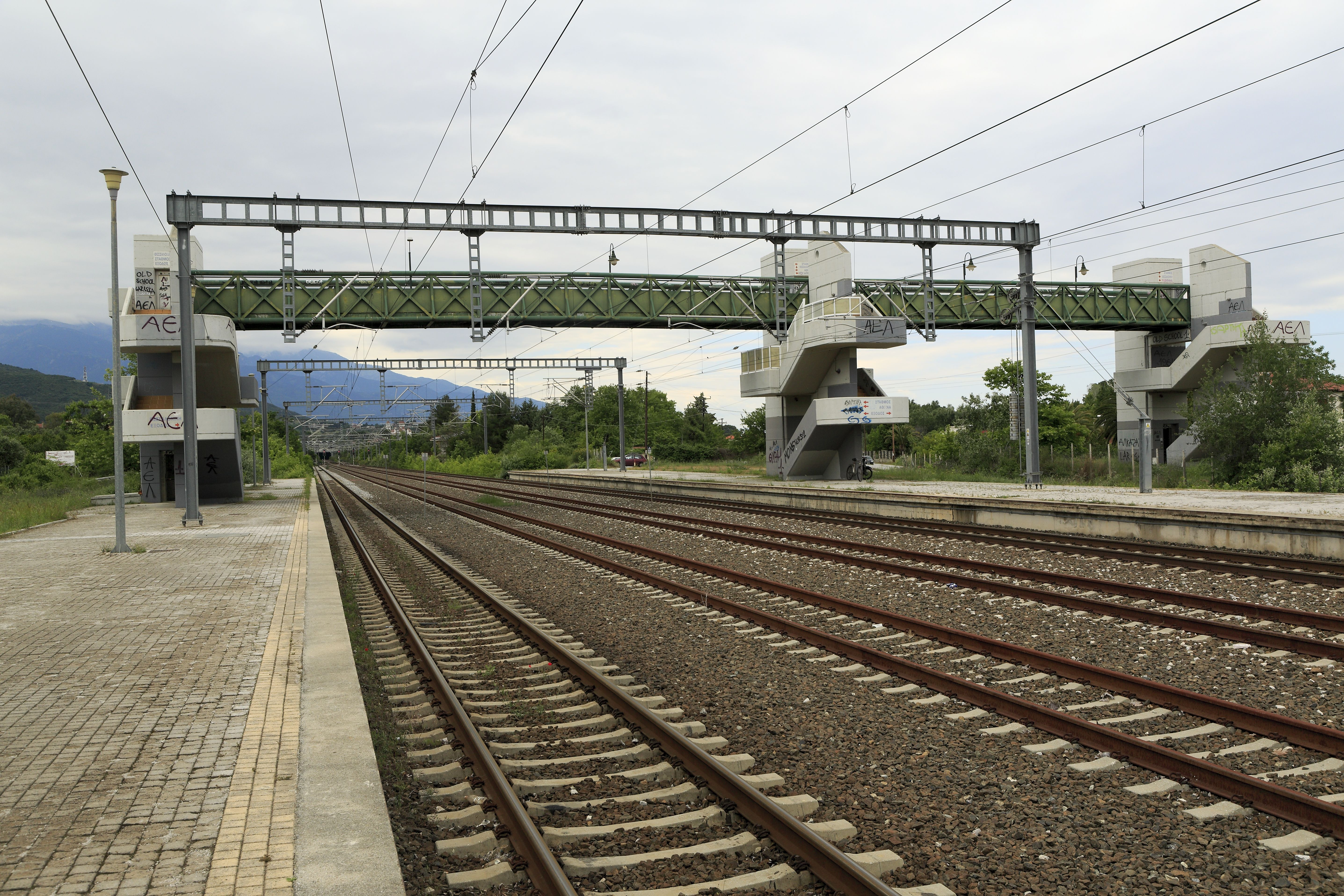
- Neoi Poroi railway station, May 2016

General information
- Location: Neoi Poroi; Larissa; Greece
- Coordinates: 39°53′59″N 22°36′53″E
- Owner: GAIAOSE
- Operator: Hellenic Train
- Line: Piraeus–Platy railway
- Platforms: 2
- Tracks: 4

Construction
- Structure type: at-grade
- Platform levels: 1
- Parking: Yes

Other information
- Status: Unstaffed
- Website: http://www.ose.gr/en/

History
- Opened: 7 September 2008; 18 years ago
- Electrified: 25 kV AC

Services
Preceding station	Regional Rail	Following station
Rapsani towards Larissa	Line T1	Leptokarya towards Thessaloniki
Location
- Location within Greece

Neoi Poroi railway station (Greek: Σιδηροδρομικός σταθμός Νέων Πόρων, romanized: Sidirodromikos stathmos Neoi Poroi) is a railway station near the coastal village of Neoi Poroi, Thessaly, Greece. Located in the Neighbouring village Neos Poros, about 1.1 kilometres (0.68 mi) from the centre of Neoi Poroi. Opened on 7 September 2008. The station is served by both fast Regional trains and Proastiakos to Thessaloniki. Intercity services pass through the station but do not call at it.

== History ==
The station opened on 7 September 2008 as part of the upgrades to the Piraeus–Platy railway. In 2009, with the Greek debt crisis unfolding OSE's Management was forced to reduce services across the network. Timetables were cut back and routes closed as the government-run entity attempted to reduce overheads. In 2017 OSE's passenger transport sector was privatised as TrainOSE, currently, a wholly owned subsidiary of Ferrovie dello Stato Italiane infrastructure, including stations, remained under the control of OSE.

The station is owned by GAIAOSE, which since 3 October 2001 owns most railway stations in Greece: the company was also in charge of rolling stock from December 2014 until October 2025, when Greek Railways (the owner of the Piraeus–Platy railway) took over that responsibility.

== Facilities ==
As of (2021) The station is staffed with a working ticket office. The station currently has three platforms; however, only two are currently in use. There are waiting rooms and toilets on platform one and waiting shelters on 2. Access to the platforms is via a raised walkway accessed by stairs or lifts. The platforms have shelters with seating; however, there are no Dot-matrix display departure and arrival screens or timetable poster boards on the platforms. The station, however, does have a small buffet. There is also Parking in the forecourt.

== Services ==
As of September 2026, the following weekday train services call at this station:

- Thessaloniki Regional Railway Line T1 between Thessaloniki and Larissa, with up to eight trains per day in each direction.

The Hellenic Train Intercity service between Athens and Thessaloniki does not call at this station.

=== Bus ===
In 2013 a new railway & bus interchange service began operations. Run by TrainOSE Bus The service allows passengers to transfer to a bus which departs for the beach for €1. The service operates every Friday, Saturday and Sunday, for the entire summer season.

== See also ==
- Railway stations in Greece
- Greek Railways
- Hellenic Train
- Proastiakos
- P.A.Th.E./P.
