= Leibethra =

Ancient Macedonian city

- Λείβηθρα (Greek)
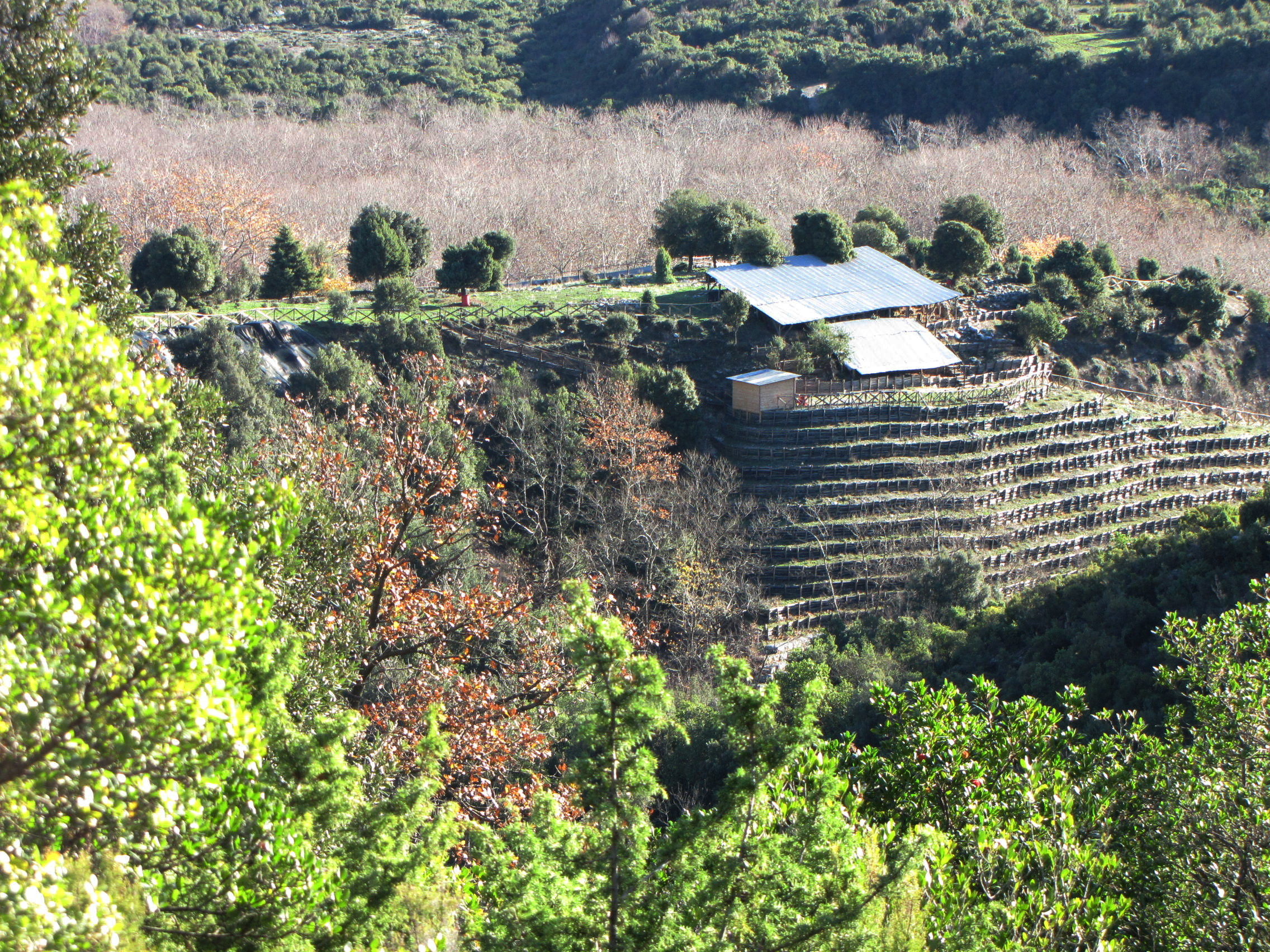
- The Acropolis of Ancient Leivithra

- 40.027432°N 22.538824°E

Leibethra or Libethra, in the modern pronunciation Leivithra (Greek: Λείβηθρα or Λίβηθρα), was an ancient Macedonian city at the foot of Mount Olympus, near the present settlement of Skotina. Archaeologists have discovered tombs there from the late Bronze Age (13th–12th century BC) containing rich burial objects. Leivithra played a remarkable role in the history of Pieria.

== Location ==
Leibethra is located at the eastern foot of Mount Olympus in the Pieria Prefecture, Central Macedonia, Greece. It is about four kilometers from the coast and two kilometers north of the village of Skotina. The city comprises the acropolis, which reaches an altitude of 130 meters, and the plain below it stretching towards the sea. The excavation site covers an area of 150 hectares, 1.5 of which belong to the fortified acropolis. The acropolis is bordered by the Griva and Kavourolaka rivers, which flow into the Ziliana river.

In the 19th century, the Frenchman Léon Heuzey identified the location of ancient Leibethra. In 1914 the location was confirmed by his countryman André Plassart.

== Mythology ==
According to Greek mythology, depending on the source consulted, Orpheus is said to have been born in Leibethra, and to have been buried there by the Muses, or to have lived in the city only temporarily. His tomb was later destroyed by a flood of the river Sys. It was a place where the Leibethrian Nymphs were worshiped. Remains of Leibethra have been found and there exists an archeological site close to Olympus.

The location of Leibethra was held to be a favourite place of the Muses, hence their epithet Libethrides (Ancient Greek: Λειβηθρίδες).

The 2nd-century geographer Pausanias writes:

In Larisa I heard another story, how that on Olympus is a city Libethra, where the mountain faces, Macedonia, not far from which city is the tomb of Orpheus. The Libethrians, it is said, received out of Thrace an oracle from Dionysus, stating that when the sun should see the bones of Orpheus, then the city of Libethra would be destroyed by a boar. The citizens paid little regard to the oracle, thinking that no other beast was big or mighty enough to take their city, while a boar was bold rather than powerful.

The Muses also gathered up the fragments of his body and buried them at Leibethra below Mount Olympus, where the nightingales sang over his grave. Cults of the Muses were also located in Leibethra. Well-known springs and memorials dedicated to Orpheus were there in great number.

When Alexander the Great set out against Persia, the cypress-wood statue of Orpheus was said to have sweated as an omen.

In addition to the poet and musician Orpheus, the place is also associated with the Muses.

The Muses lived near sources and were devoted to literature, science, and fine arts. According to Hesiod, they delighted Zeus with their singing. They looked into the past, into the present, and into the future.

Orpheus, the son of Muse Calliope and the Thracian king of Oiagros, was born in a cave between Pimpleia (near Litochoro) and Leivithra. He was killed by women who had been enraged and was buried in Leivithra. According to a legend recounted by Pausanias, the city was to be destroyed by a wild boar, as soon as Orpheus' bones saw the sun. A careless shepherd moved the top of Orpheus' grave and the sunlight touched Orpheus' remnants. Thereupon, the river Sys (ancient Greek name for wild boar, biological name: Sus Scrofa) swelled strongly and a flood destroyed the place.

== History ==
Leibethra means canals in Greek, as does the equivalent Roman-era toponym, Canalia. The excavations so far confirm that the acropolis was inhabited from the 8th century BC to the 1st century BC. The surrounding area was inhabited at least since the Bronze Age. In approximately 169 BC, the Romans erected their army camp in the plain between Herakleion (now Platamonas) and Leibethra, during the Third Macedonian War.

Findings from the time of the last settlement date from the year 100 BC. What ultimately caused the destruction of the settlement is still unclear. According to the latest findings, it is thought to have been an earthquake, possibly in connection with subsequent flooding.

== Archaeology ==
=== Excavations ===
The acropolis has been excavated only randomly, and the vast majority remains untouched. Excavated silver coins were predominantly of Macedonian origin, but coins from other parts of Greece have been unearthed as well. Also found were small clay vessels, large clay storage containers, fragments of metal work and arrow and spear tips. A weight of lead was found bearing the inscription ΛΕΙΒΗ (LEIBE).

The acropolis was fortified by a wall. The north side wall was constructed of small stones, whereas the south side wall consists of large, stacked stone blocks. On the west side, the foundation of a tower was uncovered. The shape of other buildings vary and are irregularly built at narrow streets. The foundations have a remarkable depth and indicate a multi-story structure. The upper walls were made of bricks and the roofs were covered with tiles. Large clay storage pots (pithoi) where excavated from within the floor of the dwellings.

The parts of the acropolis that had been unearthed so far are temporarily covered for their protection. Through a construction of metal baskets filled with stones, the hill was partially secured against further slipping.

In the neighborhood (Voulkani, Vakoufika, Palaia Leptokarya and Skotina) graves were discovered from the Mycenaean period and from the Iron Age. They housed weapons, tools and clay vessels as burial objects. The finds are stored in the Archaeological Museum of Dion.

The foundation of a former vineyard were cleared in the east-facing plain. Built in the middle of the 4th century BC, it was destroyed by a fire approximately at the beginning of the 3rd century BC. Fragments of a nearly 2,000-liter clay storage container are exhibited in the Archaeological Museum of Thessaloniki.

=== Archaeological Park ===
The area forms part of the Archaeological Park of Leivithra. Since the park is dedicated to Mount Olympus as well as to Orpheus, the park's paths are shaped like his associated musical instrument, the lyre.

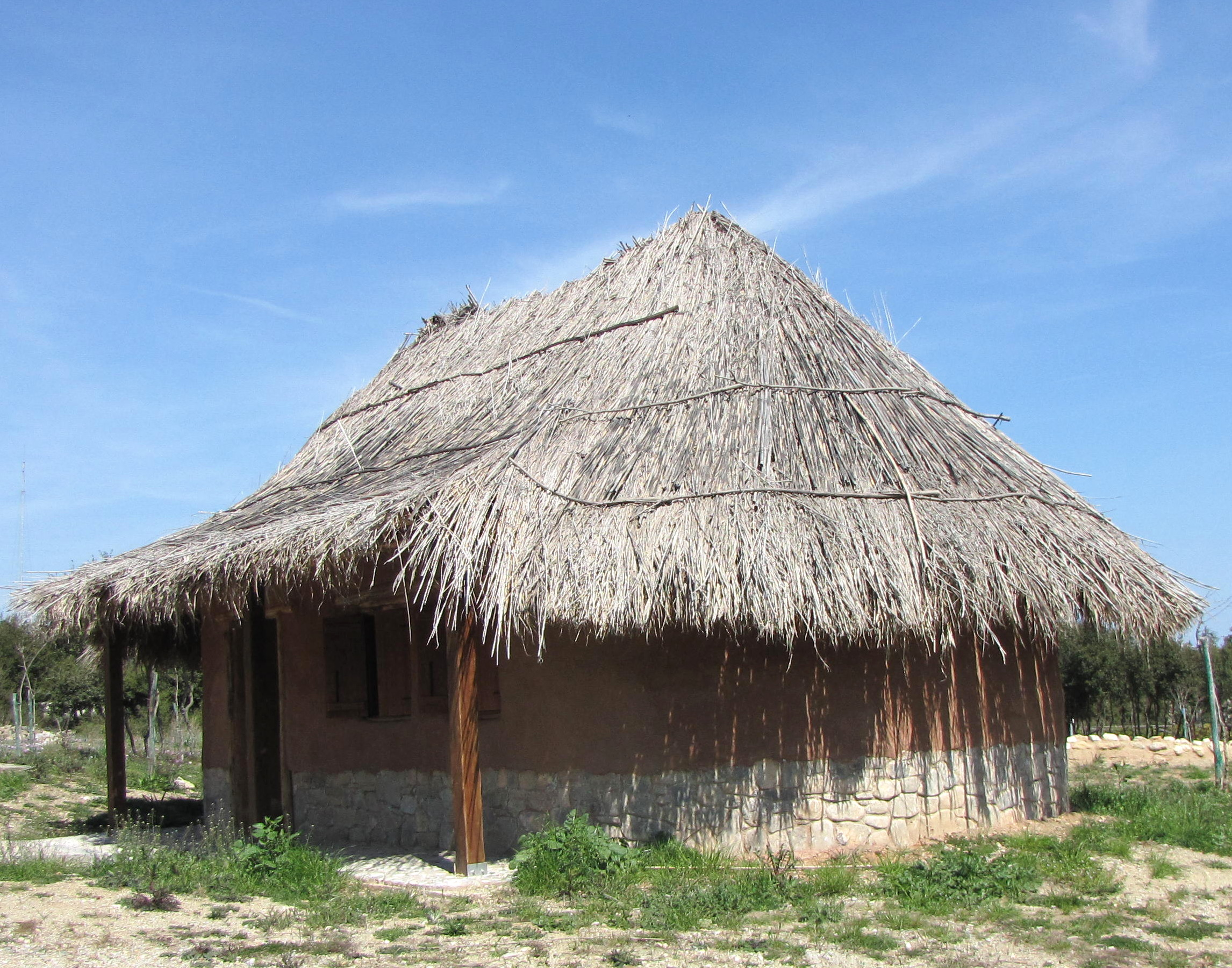
The Oval Shaped House

The park is divided into three areas:

- Educational and recreation area
- Plants and myths
- Forest and environment

The circular route starts at the ground plan of a house that dates back to the Mycenaean era. It was discovered in the course of road construction near Platamon.

Further along is an oval-shaped house, which was built in the 8th century BC. The dimensions of the ground plan were modeled on a house excavated in Krania, at the foot of the Platamon Castle. The foundation consist of stone and the basic framework of wood. The walls were made of a mixture of clay and straw, in which goat hair was incorporated. The roof was covered with reed.

The main building of the park was modeled on the ancient winery the foundation of which was excavated in the plain of Leivithra (Komboloi). Within the building, the development of the region from the Neolithic Age to the destruction of the place is represented.

On the west side of the park, four pavilions inform about the life and work of Orpheus and the Muses; in the immediate vicinity is a small open-air theater, which was created in the form of an ancient amphitheater. Behind the theater, a staircase leads to the opposite archaeological site.

Along the ways are plants that play a role in Greek mythology and whose importance is explained on information boards. On the southwestern edge of the park is a small forest trail.

=== Olympic festival ===
The archeological park of Leivithra is one of the venues of the Olympus Festival. Inside and outside the main building exhibitions of local artists and clubs take place. In addition to classical tragedies and comedies, the theater also performs concerts and plays.

== See also ==
- List of ancient Greek cities

== Bibliography ==
- Genealogical Guide to Greek Mythology (Studies in Mediterranean Archaeology, Vol 107) (Hardcover) by Carlos Parada
- Efi Poulaki-Pantermali: Makedonikos Olympos. Mythos – Istoria – Archaeologia.: Greek Ministry for Culture and Sport, Salonica 2013, ISBN 978-960-386-110-2
- Efi. Poulaki-Pantermali, J. Dimitriadiadis (cooperation E. Klinaki): Leivithra.: Greek Ministry for Culture and Sport, Katerini 2008.
