= Platamon =

Town in Pieria, Greece

Platamon Πλαταμώνας
- Community
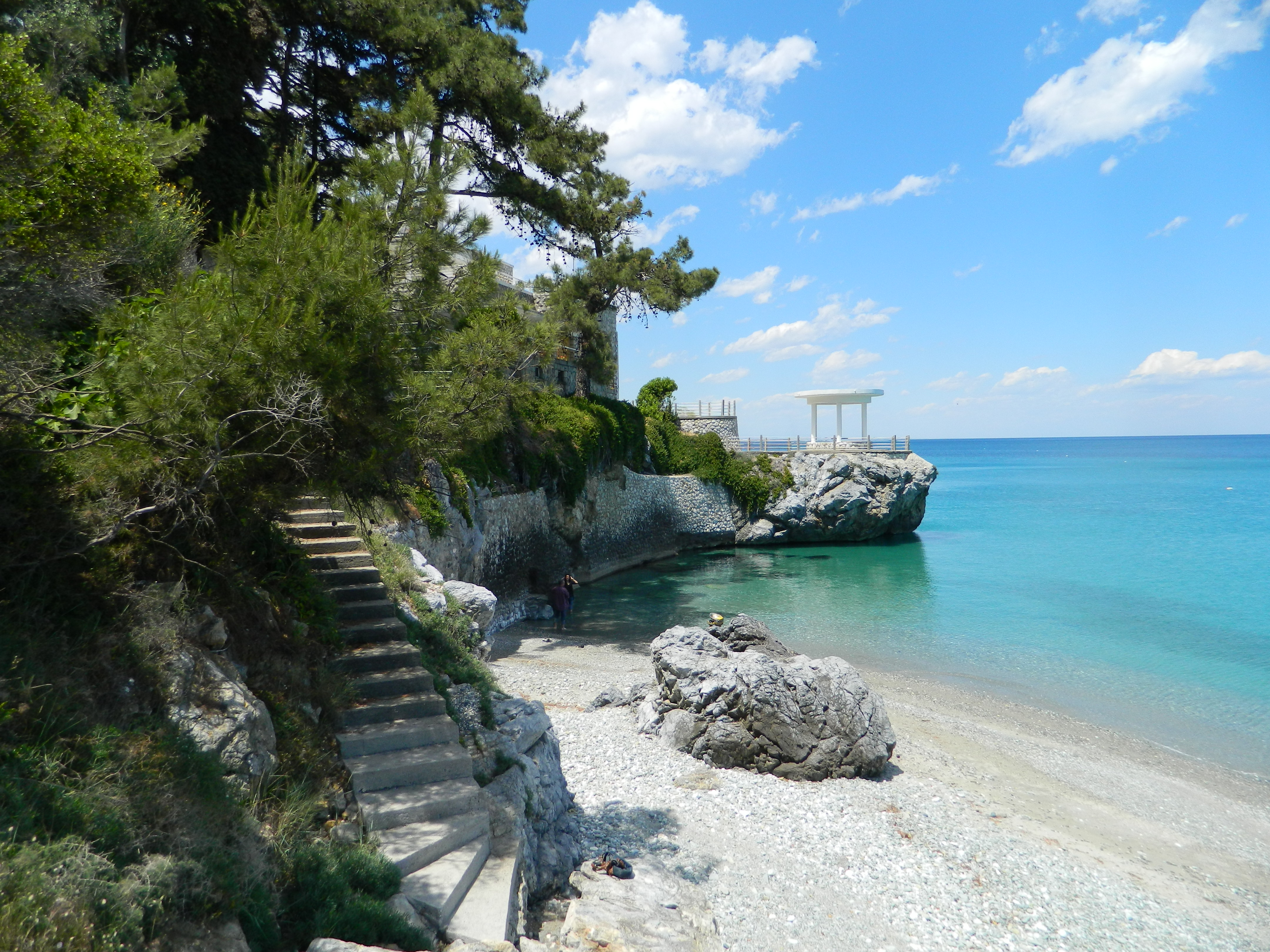
- Platamon

- Location within Greece
- Coordinates: 39°59.4′N 22°37.5′E
- Country: Greece
- Administrative region: Central Macedonia
- Regional unit: Pieria
- Municipality: Dio-Olympos
- Municipal unit: East Olympos

Population (2021)
  - Community: 1,896
- Time zone: UTC+2 (EET)
  - Summer (DST): UTC+3 (EEST)
- Area code: 23520
- Vehicle registration: KN

Platamon, or Platamonas (Greek: Πλαταμώνας, Platamónas), is a town and sea-side resort in south Pieria, Central Macedonia, Greece. Platamon had 1,896 permanent inhabitants in the 2021 census. It is part of the Municipal unit of East Olympos of the Dio-Olympos municipality.

== History ==
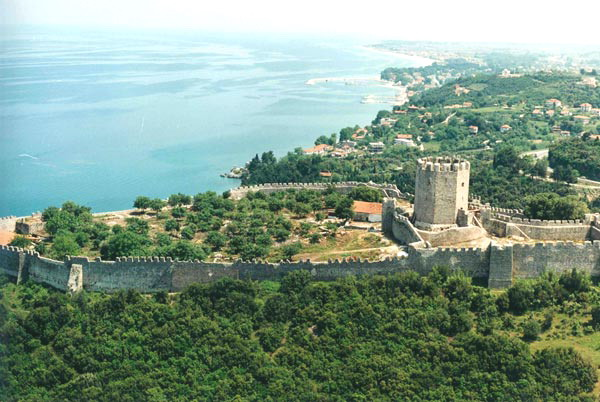
The Castle of Platamon.

The ancient settlement Herakleion was situated near the present town Platamon. In 169 BC. the Romans took their military camp on the plain between Herakleion and ancient Leivithra to start their campaign against Macedonia. Its most famous landmark is the 13th century Byzantine Castle of Platamon, built strategically along the main road from Thessaly to Macedonia through the Vale of Tempe.

== Geography ==
Platamon is situated on the Aegean Sea coast, 25 km southeast of Mount Olympus. Adjacent beach towns are Neoi Poroi to the southeast and Neos Panteleimonas to the northwest. It is 33 km south of Katerini and 43 km northeast of Larissa. The town is well known for its vast natural springs and its therapeutic spas.

== Tourism ==
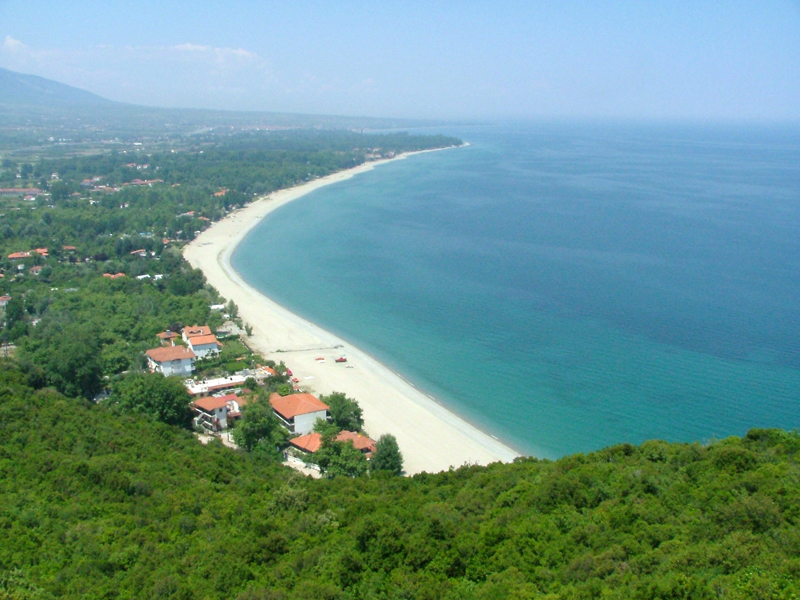
View from the Castle of Platamon.

Platamon is regarded as one of the most significant tourist destinations in Northern Greece. The town is home to numerous restaurants, cafeterias, hotels and camping resorts. Platamon is connected to the cities of Katerini and Larissa through the bus and fast railway transportation system.

Platamon is on the European route E 75 which is part of the International E-road network, which is a series of main roads in Europe.

The E 75 starts at the town of Vardø on the Barents Sea and it runs south through Finland, Poland, Czech Republic, Slovakia, Hungary, Serbia, North Macedonia, and Greece.

Platamon as a resort and fishing village have a great Marina - Port in the center of the Village. Αfter the completion of the infrastructural upgrades in spring of 2014, "Platamon Savvi Marine" provide more than 90 slips for vessels up to 65 ft as well as cruisers and megayachts.

Being located in the heart of the resort, customers will have at their disposal all needed facilities such as public transport, hotels, rental agencies, medical offices and pharmacies, dry cleaners, super markets and many others.

Marina provides customers the opportunity to take part in activities such as daily tours, water sports, fishing and diving, while being the starting place for trips in the great mountainous nature. Platamon, a graphic village easily accessible via highway and train station has a number of hotels, beach bars, taverns, restaurants, and cafes.

Located in the foothills of mountain Olympus, and framed by the castle of Platamon it is a starting point for shorter excursions to Chalkidiki, Sporades islands (Skiathos, Skopelos, Allonisos etc. ) and the north aegean sea but also provides an anchorage for those who wish to visit the coast of Pieria and the nearby mountain destinations.

During summertime the population reaches approximately 120,000 because of the number of visitors and tourists. A number of tourists come from eastern countries as well as from local Greek towns such as Larissa and Katerini.

== Sports ==
Club logo

Akadimia Platamona (Platamon Academy) is a Greek football club, based in Platamon, Pieria. In 2012, the club were promoted to Football League 2 after finishing the champions of Group 3 of Delta Ethniki, the fourth tier of the Greek football league system. Eventually the small club decided that promotion to this level was a step too far and they cooperated with Aiginiakos who took over their place at the third level. Akadimia Platamona still exist having been demoted to the Local Championship of Pieria for the 2012/13 season. The club play their home matches at the Neoi Poroi Stadium in nearby Neoi Poroi.

== Notable persons ==
- Matthias Laurenz Gräff (* 1984), Austrian painter, historian, political activist, representative of the Austrian parliamentary party NEOS in Greece and throughout Cyprus; lives in the town
