= Platamon Castle =

13th-century Crusader castle in Greece

Coordinates: 40.0060°N 22.5983°E

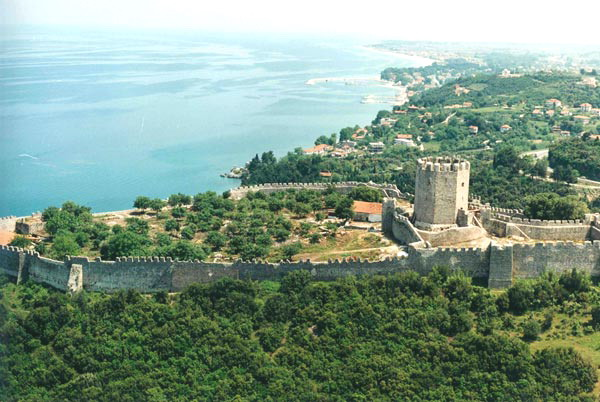
Castle of Platamon from above.

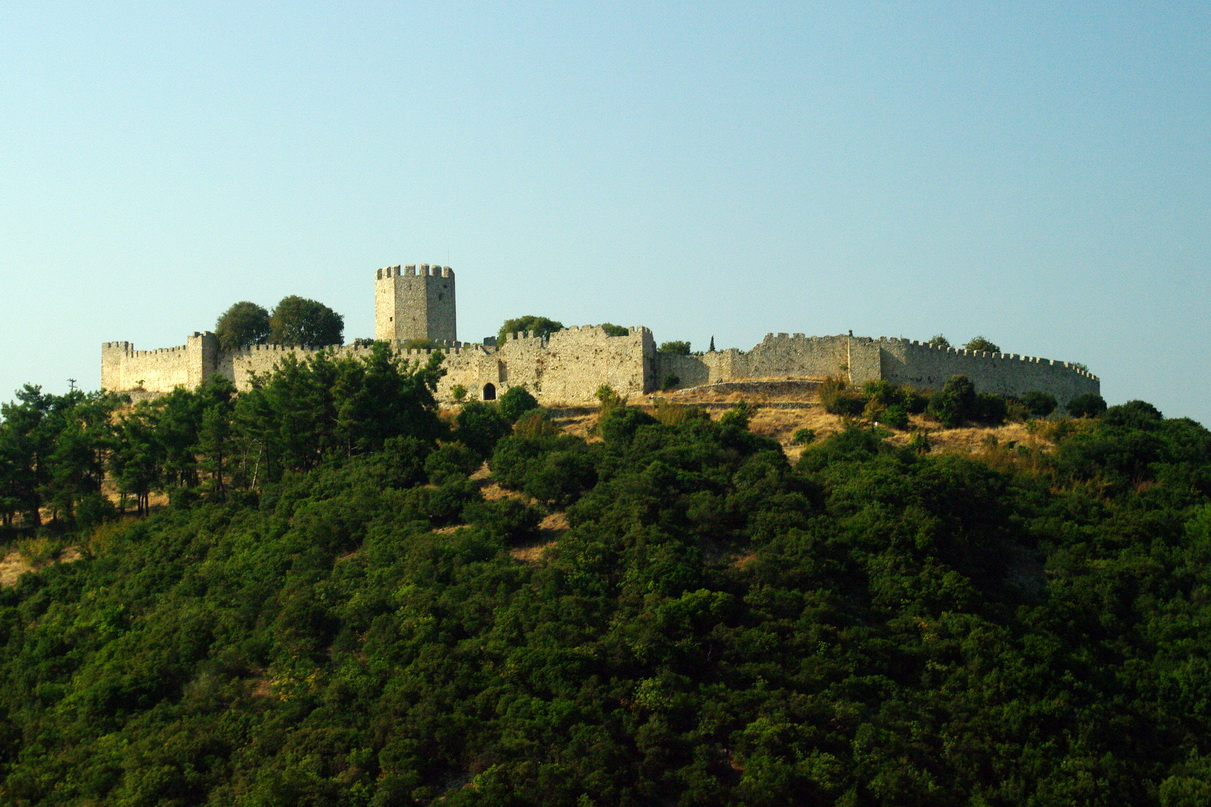
The castle of Platamon.

The Platamon Castle (Greek: Κάστρο του Πλαταμώνα), an important part of the history of Pieria, is a Crusader castle (built between 1204 and 1222) in Macedonia, Greece and is located southeast of Mount Olympus, in a strategic position which controls the exit of the Tempe valley, through which passes the main road connecting Macedonia with Thessaly and southern Greece. The tower (donjon), which overlooks the highway, is an imposing medieval fortress.

Important discoveries are the board of Hellenistic wall, that confirm the suggestion that on this position was the ancient Greek city Herakleion and the gate in the wall of the donjon. The core of the city Herakleion remains to be found, but it is posited that it is located on the northwest side of the castle's hill due to shells and coins found during recent excavations.

== History ==
The place, which today is occupied by the castle, was used by the city of Herakleion (Ἡράκλειον) in pre-Christian times. Not only on the top of the castle hill, but also at the foot of the hill, were settlements that were assigned to this ancient city. Around 360 BC Skylax of Karyandar described the place as "the first Macedonian city behind the river Peneios". The Roman historian Titius Livius has a more accurate position determination. "Between Dion and Tembi lying on a rock," he described the place, which is identical with the position of the castle. But even earlier, since the Bronze Age, a settlement of the castle hill has been proved.

In the year 430 BC, The Athenians conquered the place to control from here the Thermaic Gulf to their possessions on the Chalkidiki. At the same time, the country's most popular north-south route runs along the hill. At the beginning of the 3rd century BC, the city and the now established port were destroyed. By what, or by whom, is not exactly known. A short time later the region was conquered by the Romans. In the year 169 BC, from Thessaly coming, they held their camp in the plain between Herakleion and Leivithra before starting their campaign against the Macedonian Kingdom. Of course the outstanding strategic importance of the hill was not hidden from them. Probably from this time comes the acropolis, the upper town, which was surrounded by a low wall. From the time around Christ's birth to the middle Byzantine epoch, in the 10th century AD, little evidence was found of the events at this time. The name Platamon for the close vicinity of the hill emerges for the first time. With this term Homer referred to a rock surrounded by the sea. In the 12th century, the city of Platamon is described and the castle as such is mentioned for the first time. In 1425, the Venetians briefly captured the castle from the Ottomans during their operations in the region. According to several historical accounts and local sources, during the assault, more than 100 Ottoman defenders were burned alive inside the castle, possibly when parts of the structure (such as the main bailey or wooden elements) were set on fire after the garrison refused to surrender. The Venetians held the fortress only until 1427, when the Ottomans regained control. The last battles took place in the Second World War. New Zealand troops who had moved into this area were bombed.

== The Castle ==
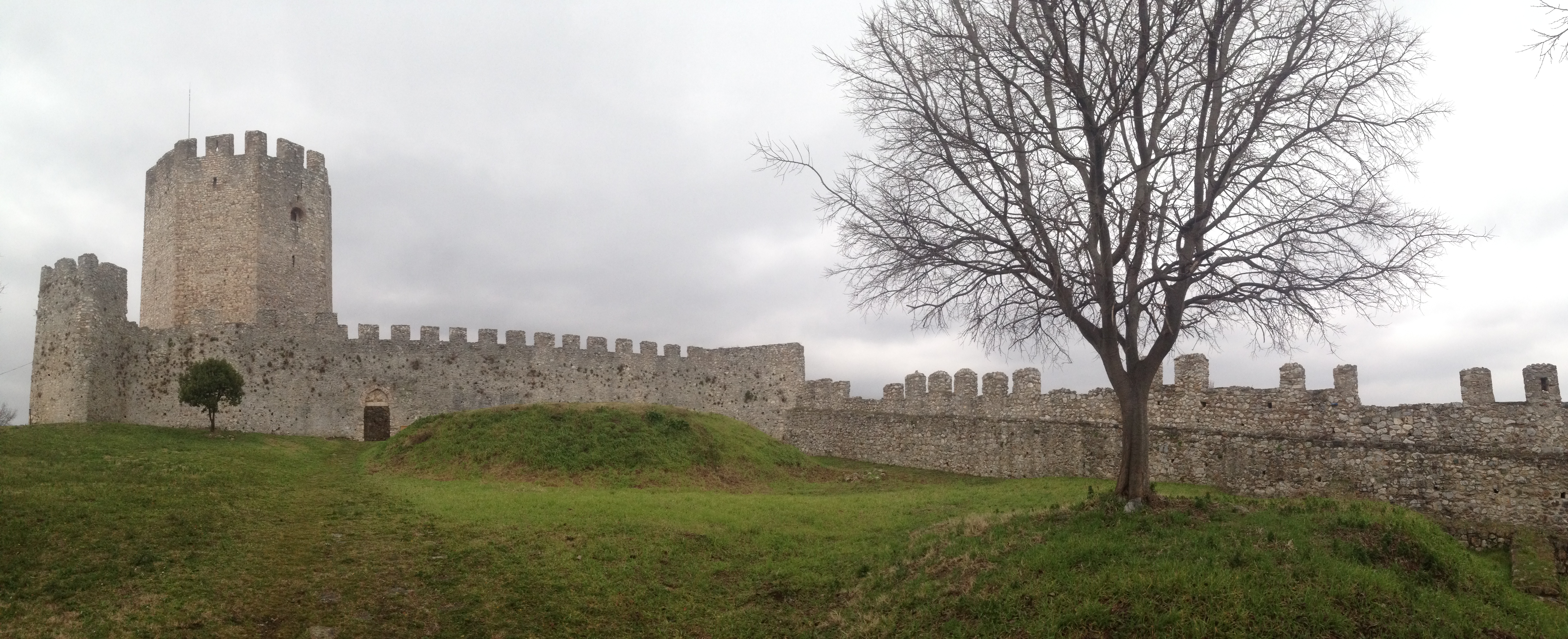
The bastion

A footpath leads from the parking lot to the gate of the castle. It is open every day between 08:30 and 15:00. What we call Platamon today included the city of Platamon and the actual castle. The extensive area is designed as a polygon and had irregular towers at irregular intervals. At the foot of the hill, to the left and right of the land, which extends into the sea, are two smaller towers. Only the main tower, the donjon, which is surrounded by its own wall, is located in the western part of the complex. Unfortunately, it is not open to visitors. Here, in fighting, was the last retreat for the inhabitants. For strategic reasons, there is only a relatively narrow gate that can be defended well. Many of the basics of churches, houses, a smithy, pottery and other buildings testify to the life of the past. Partially well-preserved cannons served in the later Middle Ages, the defense of pirates and the general defense of the fortress. To ensure the water supply during a longer lasting siege, there are several cisterns on the site.

The walls have a height of 7.50 to 9.50 m and have a thickness between 1.20 and 2 meters. In the course of the centuries, they have been continually increased, and the individual sections of the building can still be seen today. Except for the destroyed upper part of the defense route in the east, they are well preserved. The wall is accessible in several places for visitors and invites you to enjoy the fantastic view of the surroundings.

Originally the castle complex was surrounded by another, lower wall. It formed the first line of defense in an emergency. The only intact building is the small church Agia Paraskevi. It is richly decorated and offers space for around 30 believers.

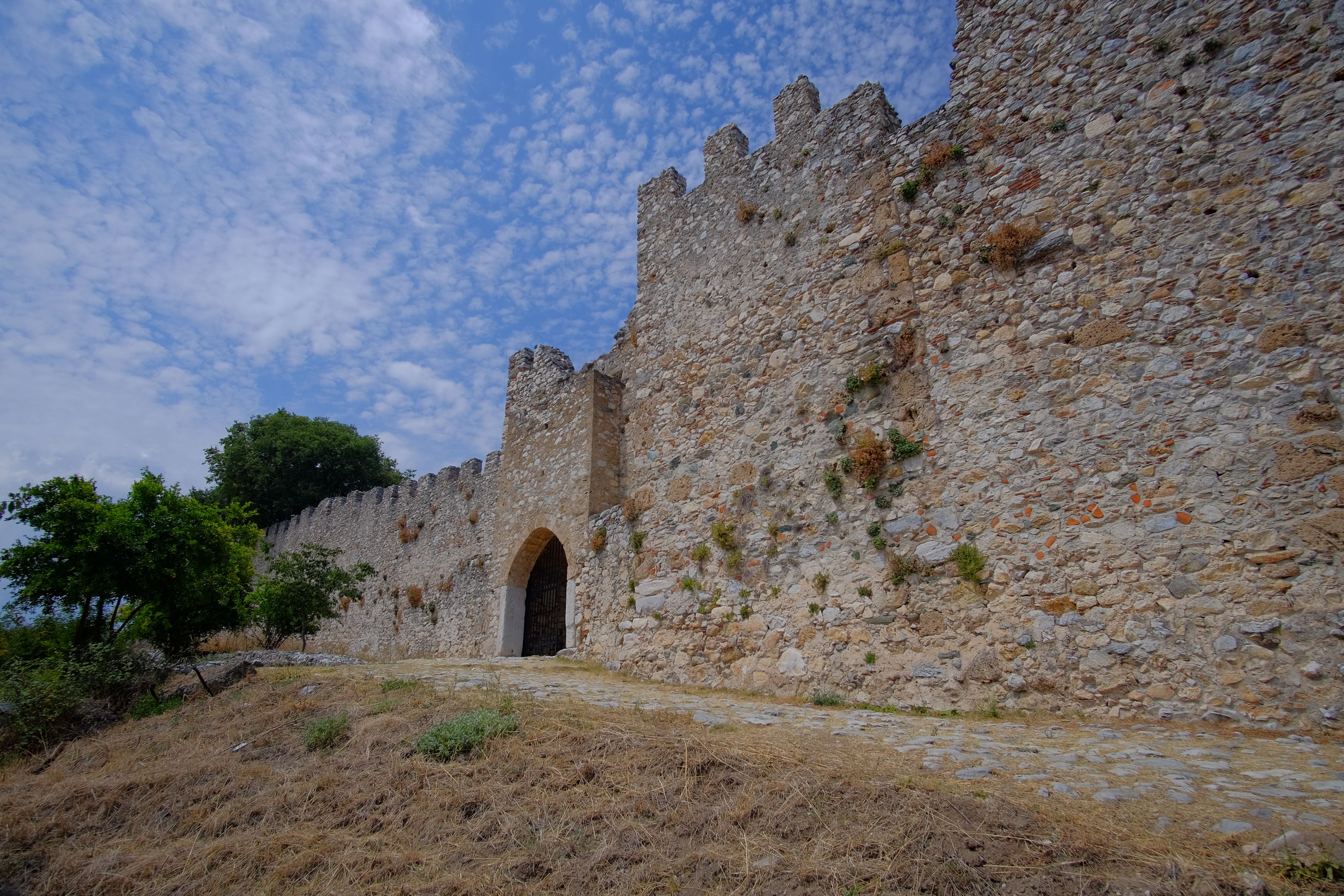
Platamon Castle is a Crusader castle built between 1204 and 1222 in Macedonia, Greece

Paradoxically, the construction of a railway tunnel through the hill a few years ago has, from the point of view of archaeologists, used the facility more than harmed. During the construction, further ground plans of buildings were discovered which are assigned to the historic city of Herakleion.

== Present use ==
Today, the acropolis serves as one of the Olympus Festival venues. In the open air, with good acoustics, theatrical performances and concerts take place here.

== See also ==
- List of Crusader castles

== Sources ==
- Vakalopoulos, Apostolos (1972). Τα κάστρα του Πλαταμώνα και της Ωριάς Τεμπών και ο τεκές του Χασάν Μπαμπά [The castles of Platamon and Oria at Tempe and the tekke of Hasan Baba] (in Greek). Thessaloniki: Society for Macedonian Studies.
