= Dion-Olympos =

Dion-Olympos Δίον-Όλυμπος
- Municipality
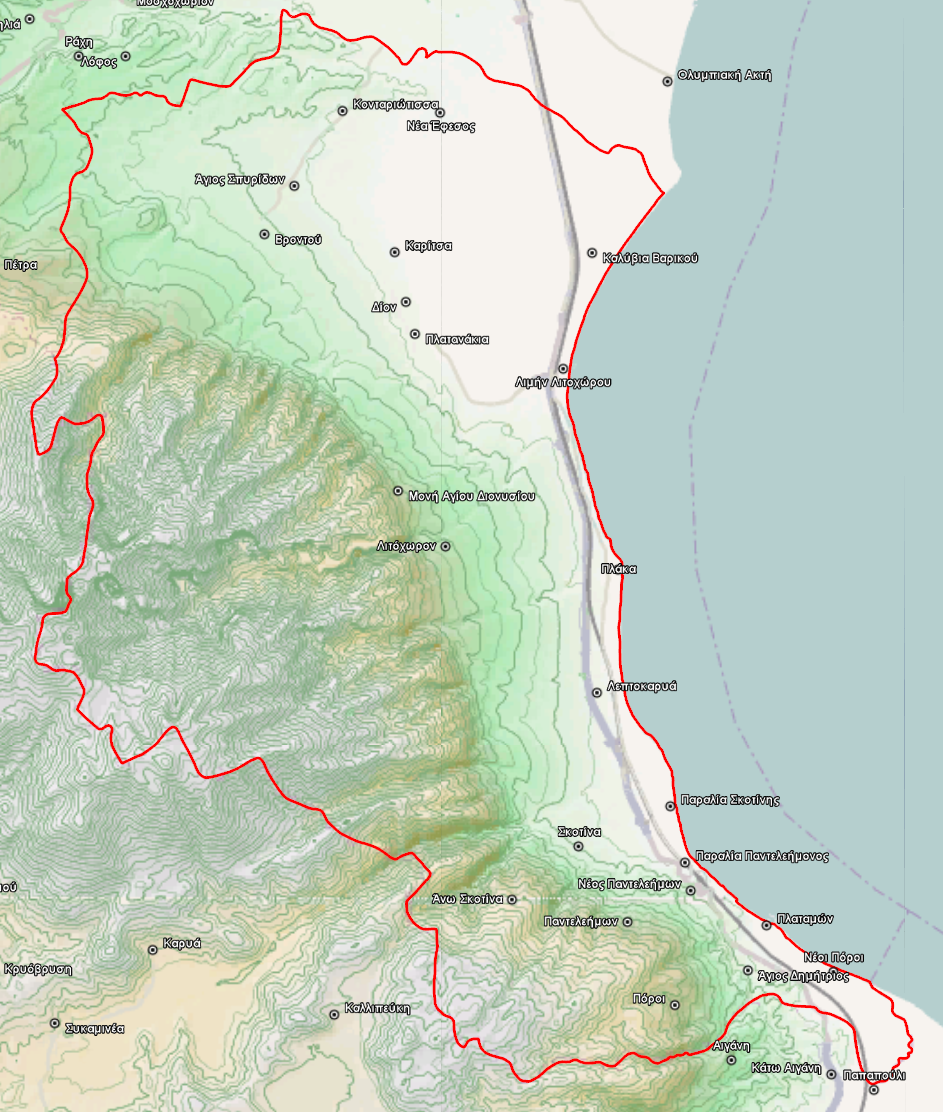

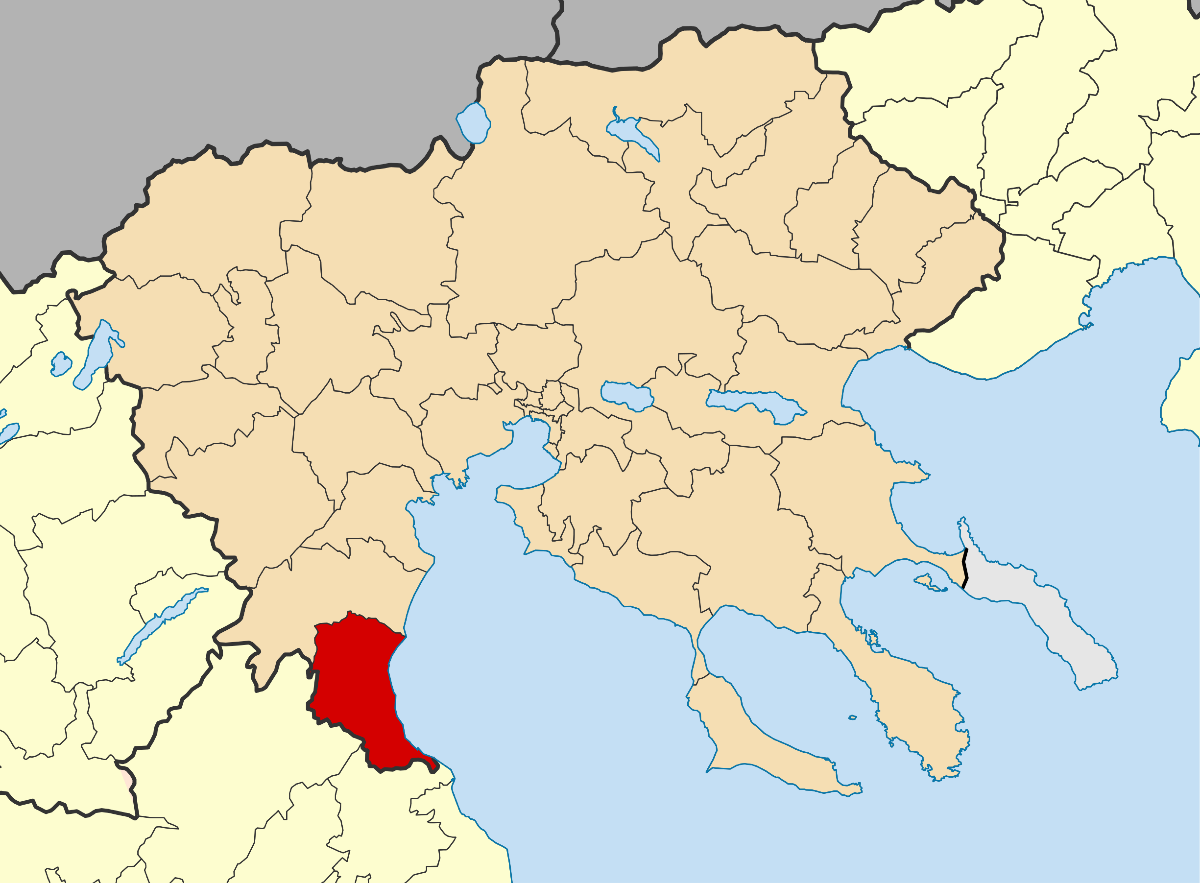

- Location within Greece
- Coordinates: 40°06′N 22°30′E
- Country: Greece
- Administrative region: Central Macedonia
- Regional unit: Pieria
- Seat: Litochoro

Government
  - Mayor: Evangelos Geroliolios (since 2023)

Area
  - Municipality: 495.3 km^{2} (191.2 sq mi)

Population (2021)
  - Municipality: 23,955
  - Density: 48.36/km^{2} (125.3/sq mi)
- Time zone: UTC+2 (EET)
  - Summer (DST): UTC+3 (EEST)
- Website: www.dion-olympos.gr

Dion-Olympos (Greek: Δίον-Όλυμπος, Díon-Ólympos) is a municipality in the Pieria regional unit, Central Macedonia, Greece. The seat of the municipality is the town Litochoro. The municipality has an area of 495.314 km^{2}.

== Municipality ==
The municipality Dion-Olympos was formed as part of the 2011 local government reform by the merger of the following 3 former municipalities, that became municipal units:

- Dion
- East Olympos
- Litochoro
