= List of Greek place names =

This is a list of Greek place names as they exist in the Greek language.

- Places involved in the history of Greek culture, including:
  - Historic Greek regions, including:
    - Ancient Greece, including colonies and contacted peoples
    - Hellenistic world, including successor states and contacted peoples
    - Roman Empire and Byzantine Empire, including successor states
    - Ottoman Empire, including successor states
    - Septinsular Republic
    - Modern Greece and Cyprus, and also what remains of treaty Greek minorities in Turkey
  - Places that have or had important Greek-speaking or ethnic Greek minorities or exile communities
  - Places of concern to Greek culture, religion or tradition, including:
    - Greek mythology
    - Greek Jews, including Romaniotes and exiled Sephardim
    - Greco-Buddhism
    - Christianity until the Great Schism, and afterwards the Eastern Orthodox Church, Eastern Rite, etc.
    - Greek Muslims, and those outside Greece who are Greek-speaking or ethnic Greek
- Places whose official names include a Greek form.
- Places whose names originate from the Greek language, even if they were never involved in Greek history or culture.

Although this list includes toponyms from Roman times, this list does not include later wholly Latin-derived names that have (nor had) no Greek linguistic involvement, involvement with the Greek world, nor significant Greek-speaking communities. (A notable exception may be places such as Australia, which has one of the largest modern Greek-speaking communities outside Greece and Cyprus.) However, much of the Roman Empire did have significant Greek-speaking communities, as Greek had been a popular language among the Roman elite from the beginning.

Both koine and modern forms and transliterations (including polytonic spellings) are listed if available. This list is incomplete, and some items in the list lack academic detail.

As a historical linguistics article, this list is an academic lexicon for the history of Greek place names, and is not a formal dictionary nor gazetteer and should not be relied upon as such.

Indeed, many toponyms in Modern Greek now have different names than were used in by Greek-speaking communities in the past. An example is Malta, which was called Μελίτη (Melítē) and was once home to a Greek-speaking community. However, this community is gone or assimilated, and the common Modern Greek name is Μάλτα (Málta, from Maltese).

However, in other cases, Modern Greek has retained archaic names (sometimes with grammatical modifications).

Distinctly Greek names are also largely retained for places without significant modern Greek populations that had a larger Greek-speaking presence until relatively recent times in history, including many areas in what are now Turkey, Egypt, Russia and Ukraine.

== Format ==
The names presented are in Classical Greek spelling, specifically of the Attic dialect, scientific transliteration of Classical Greek, standard Modern Greek, the United Nations transliteration for Modern Greek, and the Modern Greek pronunciation in the International Phonetic Alphabet.

== List ==
=== Α ===
Classical/Katharevousa		Modern Greek			English; Modern name
Greek alphabet	Transliteration	Greek alphabet	Transliteration	IPA	English; Modern name
Ἄβδηρα	Ábdēra	Άβδηρα	Ávdira	ˈavðira	Abdera
Ἄβυδος	Ábydos	Άβυδος	Ávydos	ˈaviðos	Abydus; Abydos
Ἀγαθὴ Τύχη	Agathḕ Týkhē	Αγαθή Τύχη	Agathí Týchi	aɣaˈθi ˈtiçi	Agathe Tyche; Agde
Ἀγγλία	Anglía	Αγγλία	Anglía	aŋˈɡlia	Anglia; England
Ἁγία Βαρβάρα	Hagía Barbára	Άγια Βαρβάρα	Ágia Varvára	aʝía varˈvara	Agia Varvara
Ἁγία Παρασκευή	Hagía Paraskeuḗ	Αγία Παρασκευή	Agía Paraskeví	aˈʝia parasceˈvi	Agia Paraskevi
Ἁγία Πετρούπολις	Hagía Petroúpolis	Αγία Πετρούπολη	Agía Petroúpoli	aˈʝia peˈtrupoli	Saint Petersburg
Ἁγία Σοφία	Hagía Sophía	Αγία Σοφία	Agía Sofía	aˈʝia soˈfia	Hagia Sophia; Ayasofya
Ἅγιος Εὐστράτιος	Hágios Eustrátios	Άγιος Ευστράτιος	Ágios Efstrátios	ˈaʝios efˈstratios	Agios Efstratios
Ἅγιος Νικόλαος	Hágios Nikólaos	Άγιος Νικόλαος	Ágios Nikólaos	ˈaʝios niˈkolaos	Agios Nikolaos
Ἄγκυρα	Ánkyra	Άγκυρα	Ágkyra	ˈaɟira	Ancyra; Angora; Engürü; Ankara
Άδραμύττιον	Hadramýttion	Άδραμύττιον	Adramýttion	aðɾaˈmition	Hadramyttion; Edremit
Ἁδριανούπολις	Hadrianoúpolis	Αδριανούπολη	Adrianoúpoli	aðriaˈnupoli	Adrianople; Edirne
Ἄζωτος	Ázōtos	Άζωτος	Ázotos	ˈazotos	Azotus; Ashdod
Ἀθῆναι	Athênai	Αθήνα	Athína	aˈθina	Athens
Ἄθως	Áthōs	Άθως	Áthos	ˈaθos	Athos
Αἰγαῖαι, Αἰγαί	Aigaîai	Αιγές	Aigés	eˈʝes	Aegaeae; Nemrutkale
Αἰγαῖον	Aigaîon	Αιγαίο	Aigaío	eˈʝeo	Aegean
Αἴγινα	Aígina	Αίγινα	Aígina	ˈeʝina	Aegina
Αἴγιο	Aígio	Αίγιο	Aígio	ˈeʝio	Egio
Αἴγυπτος	Aígyptos	Αίγυπτος	Aígyptos	ˈeʝiptos	Egypt
ᾍδης	Hāídēs	Άδης	Ádis	ˈaðis	Hades
Αἰθιοπία	Aithiopía	Αιθιοπία	Aithiopía	eθioˈpia	Ethiopia
Αἰκατερίνη	Aikaterínē	Κατερίνη	Kateríni	kateˈrini	Katerini
Αἶνος	Aînos	Αίνος	Aínos	ˈenos	Aenus
Αἰολικαὶ Νῆσοι	Aiolikai Nêsoi	Αιολικά Νησιά	Aioliká Nisiá	eoliˈka niˈsça	Aeolian Islands
Αἰολίς	Aiolís	Αιολίδα	Aiolída	eoˈliða	Aeolis
Αἴτνη	Aítnē	Αίτνη	Aítni	ˈetni	Etna
Αἰτωλία	Aitōlía	Αιτωλία	Aitolía	etoˈlia	Aetolia
Ἄκανθος	Ákanthos	Άκανθος	Ákanthos	ˈakanθos	Acanthus
Ἀκαρνανία	Akarnanía	Ακαρνανία	Akarnanía	akarnaˈnia	Acarnania
Ἀκεσίνης	Akesínēs	Ακεσίνης	Akesínis	aceˈsinis	Acesines; Chenab River
Ἀκράγας	Akrágas	Ακράγαντας	Akrágantas	aˈkraɣadas	Acragas; Agrigentum
Ἀκρόπολις	Akrópolis	Ακρόπολη	Akrópoli	aˈkropoli	Acropolis
Ἀλάβανδα	Alábanda	Αλάβανδα	Alávanda	aˈlavanða	Alabanda; Doğanyurt
Ἀλβανία	Albanía	Αλβανία	Alvanía	alvaˈnia	Albania
Ἀλεξάνδρεια	Aleksándreia	Αλεξάνδρεια	Alexándreia	ale'ksanðria	Alexandria; al-Iskandariya
Ἀλεξανδρέττα	Aleksandrétta	Αλεξανδρέττα	Alexandrétta	aleksanˈðreta	Alexandretta; İskenderun
Ἀλεξανδρούπολις	Aleksandroúpolis	Αλεξανδρούπολη	Alexandroúpoli	aleksanˈðrupoli	Alexandroupoli
Ἁλίαρτος	Halíartοs	Αλίαρτος	Alíartοs	a'liartos	Haliartus
Ἁλικαρνασσός	Halikarnassós	Αλικαρνασσός	Alikarnassós	alikarnaˈsos	Halicarnassus; Petronium; Bodrum
Ἄλινδα	Álinda	Άλινδα	Álinda	ˈalinða	Alinda; Karpuzlu
Ἀλμάτι	Almáti	Αλμάτι	Almáti	alˈmati	Almaty
Ἄλπεις	Álpeis	Άλπεις	Álpeis	ˈalpis	Alps
Ἅλυς	Hálys	Άλυς	Álys	ˈalis	Halys; Kızılırmak
Ἄλφειός	Alpheiós	Αλφειός	Alfeiós	alfiˈos	Alpheus
Άλώνη	Halónē	Αλώνη	Alóni	a'loni	Halone; Paşalimanı Adası
Ἀμάσεια	Amáseia	Αμάσεια	Amáseia	aˈmasia	Amaseia; Amasya
Ἁμβοῦργον	Hamboûrgon	Αμβούργο	Amvoúrgo	amˈvurɣo	Hamburg
Ἀμερική	Amerikḗ	Αμερική	Amerikí	ameriˈci	America
Ἀμοργός	Amorgós	Αμοργός	Amorgós	amorˈɣos	Amorgos
Ἀμβρακία	Ambrakía	Αμβρακία	Amvrakía	amvraˈcia	Ambracia
Ἀμύκλαι	Amúklai	Αμύκλες	Amýkles	aˈmikles	Amyclae
Ἀμφίπολις	Amphípolis	Αμφίπολη	Amfípoli	amˈfipoli	Amphipolis
Ἄμφισσα	Ámphissa	Άμφισσα	Ámfissa	ˈamfisa	Amphissa
Ἀμφρυσσός	Amphryssós	Άμφρισσος	Ámfrissos	ˈamfrisos	Amphryssos
Ἄναια	Ánaia	Άναια	Ánaia	ˈanea	Anaea
Ἀνατολή	Anatolḗ	Ανατολία	Anatolía	anatoˈlia	Anatolia; Asia Minor
Ἀνάφη	Anáphē	Ανάφη	Anáfi	aˈnafi	Anaphe; Anafi
Ἄνδρος	Ándros	Άνδρος	Ándros	ˈanðros	Andros
Ἀνίων	Aníōn	Ανίων	Aníon	aˈni.on	Anio; Aniene
Ἀνταρκτική	Antarktikḗ	Ανταρκτική	Antarktikí	adarktiˈci	Antarctica
Ἀντικύθηρα	Antikúthēra	Αντικύθηρα	Antikýthira	adiˈciθira	Antikythera
Ἀντίμηλος	Antímēlos	Αντίμηλος	Antímilos	aˈdimilos	Antimelos
Ἄντιον	Ántion	Άντιο	Ántio	'adio	Antium; Anzio
Ἀντιόχεια	Antiókheia	Αντιόχεια	Antiócheia	adiˈoçia	Antioch; Antakya
Ἀντιπαξοί	Antipaksoí	Αντιπαξοί	Antipaxoí	adipaˈksi	Antipaxos; Antipaxi
Ἀντίπαρος	Antíparos	Αντίπαρος	Antíparos	aˈdiparos	Antiparos
Ἀντίπολις	Antípolis	Αντίπολη	Antípoli	aˈdipoli	Antipolis; Antibes
Ἀντίῤῥιον	Antírrhion	Αντίρριο	Antírrio	aˈdirio	Antirrhium; Antirrio
Ἀπουλία	Apoulía	Απουλία	Apoulía	apuˈlia	Apulia
Ἀραβία	Arabía	Αραβία	Aravía	araˈvi.a	Arabia
Ἀράξης	Aráksēs	Αράξης	Aráxis	aˈraksis	Araxes; Araks
Ἄργιλος	Árgilos	Άργιλος	Árgilos	ˈarʝilos	Argilus
Ἀργολίς	Argolís	Αργολίδα	Argolída	arɣoˈliða	Argolis
Ἄργος	Árgos	Άργος	Árgos	ˈarɣos	Argos
Ἀργοστόλιον	Argostólion	Αργοστόλι	Argostóli	arɣoˈstoli	Argostoli
Ἀρεόπολις	Areópolis	Αρεόπολη	Areópoli	areˈopoli	Areopoli
Ἄρης	Árēs	Άρης	Áris	ˈaris	Mars
Ἀρκαδία	Arkadía	Αρκαδία	Arkadía	arkaˈðia	Arcadia
Ἀρκοί	Arkoí	Αρκοί	Arkoí	arˈci	Arci
Ἀρκτικός	Arktikós	Αρκτικός	Arktikós	arktiˈkos	Arctic
Άρκτόνησος	Arktónēssos	Κούταλη	Koútali	ˈkutali	Koutali; Ekinlik Adası
Ἀρμενία	Armenía	Αρμενία	Armenía	armeˈnia	Armenia
Ἄρτα	Árta	Άρτα	Árta	ˈarta	Arta
Ἀσία	Asía	Ασία	Asía	aˈsia	Asia
Ἀσίνη	Asínē	Ασίνη	Asíni	aˈsini	Asine
Ἀσκάλων	Askálōn	Ασκάλων	Askálon	a'skalon	Ascalon
Ἀσσυρία	Assyría	Ασσυρία	Assyría	asiˈria	Assyria
Ἀστανά	Astaná	Αστανά	Astaná	astaˈna	Astana
Ἀστόρια	Astória	Αστόρια	Astória	a'storia	Astoria
Ἀστυπάλαια	Astypálaia	Αστυπάλαια	Astypálaia	astiˈpalea	Astypalaea
Ἀσωπός	Asōpós	Ασωπός	Asopós	asoˈpos	Asopus
Ἀτισών	Atisṓn	Ατισών	Atisón	atiˈson	Adige
Ἀτλαντικός	Atlantikós	Ατλαντικός	Atlantikós	atladiˈkos	Atlantic
Ἀτλάντις	Atlántis	Ατλάντιδα	Atlántida	atlaˈdiða	Atlantis
Ἄτλας	Átlas	Άτλαντας	Átlantas	ˈatladas	Atlas
Ἀτροπατηνή	Atropatēnḗ	Ατροπατηνή	Atropatiní	atropatiˈni	Atropatene; Azerbaijan
Ἀττάλεια	Attáleia	Αττάλεια	Attáleia	aˈtalia	Attalia; Antalya
Ἀττική	Attikḗ	Αττική	Attikí	atiˈci	Attica
Αὐστραλία	Australía	Αυστραλία	Afstralía	afstraˈli.a	Australia
Αὐστρία	Austría	Αυστρία	Afstría	af'stria	Austria
Ἀφίδναι	Aphídnai	Αφίδνες	Afídnes	a'fiðnes	Aphidnae
Ἀφρική	Aphrikḗ	Αφρική	Afrikí	afriˈci	Africa
Ἀφροδίτη	Aphrodítē	Αφροδίτη	Afrodíti	afroˈðiti	Venus
Ἀχαΐα	Akhaḯa	Αχαΐα	Achaḯa	axaˈia	Achaea
Ἀχαρναί	Akharnaí	Αχαρνές	Acharnés	axar'nes	Acharnae; Acharnes
Ἀχελῷος	Akhelōíos	Αχελώος	Achelóos	açeˈlo.os	Achelous
Ἀχέρων	Akhérōn	Αχέρων	Achéron	aˈçeron	Acheron

=== Β ===
Classical/Katharevousa		Modern Greek			English; Modern name
Greek alphabet	Transliteration	Greek alphabet	Transliteration	IPA	English; Modern name
Βαβυλωνία	Babylōnía	Βαβυλωνία	Vavylonía	vaviloˈnia	Babylonia
Βαῖτις	Baîtis	Βαίτις	Vaítis	ˈvetis	Baetis; Guadalquivir
Βακτρία	Baktría	Βακτρία	Vaktría	vakˈtria	Bactria
Βάρκη	Bárkē	Βάρκη	Várki	ˈvarci	Barca
Βαρκινών	Barkinṓn	Βαρκελώνη	Varkelóni	varceˈloni	Barcino; Barcelona
Βατικανόν	Batikanόn	Βατικανό	Vatikanό	vatikaˈno	Vatican
Βέλγιον	Bélgion	Βέλγιο	Vélgio	ˈvelʝio	Belgica; Belgium
Βενετία	Benetía	Βενετία	Venetía	veneˈtia	Venice
Βενυσία	Benysía	Βενυσία	Venysía	veniˈsia	Venusia
Βεργίνα	Bergína	Βεργίνα	Vergína	verˈʝina	Vergina
Βέροια	Béroia	Βέροια	Véroia	ˈveria	Beroea; Veria; Aleppo
Βερολῖνον	Berolînon	Βερολίνο	Verolíno	veroˈlino	Berlin
Βηθλεέμ	Bēthleém	Βηθλεέμ	Vithleém	viθleˈem	Bethlehem
Βηρυτός	Bērytós	Βηρυτός	Virytós	viriˈtos	Beirut
Βητριακόν	Bētriakón	Βητριακό	Vitriakó	vitriaˈko	Bedriacum
Βιθυνία	Bithynía	Βιθυνία	Vithynía	viθiˈnia	Bithynia
Βικτώρια	Biktṓria	Βικτώρια	Viktória	viˈktoria	Victoria
Βλαχία	Blakhía	Βλαχία	Vlachía	vlaˈçia	Vlachia; Wallachia
Βοιωτία	Boiōtía	Βοιωτία	Voiotía	vioˈtia	Boeotia
Βόλος	Bólos	Βόλος	Vólos	ˈvolos	Volos
Βόννη	Bónnē	Βόννη	Vónni	ˈvoni	Bonn
Βορυσθένης	Borysthénēs	Βορυσθένης	Vorysthénis	voriˈsθenis	Borysthenes; Dnieper
Βόσπορος	Bósporos	Βόσπορος	Vósporos	ˈvosporos	Bosphorus
Βοστώνη	Bostṓnē	Βοστώνη	Vostóni	voˈstoni	Boston
Βοττιαία	Bottiaía	Βοττιαία	Vottiaía	votiˈea	Bottiaea
Βουκουρέστιον	Boukouréstion	Βουκουρέστι	Voukourésti	vukuˈresti	Bucharest; București
Βουλγαρία	Boulgaría	Βουλγαρία	Voulgaría	vulɣaˈria	Bulgaria
Βουρλά	Bourlá	Βουρλά	Vourlá	vurˈla	Urla
Βραγχίδαι	Brankhídai	Βραγχίδες	Vranchídes	vraɲˈçiðes	Branchidae; Didyma; Yenihisar
Βραζιλία	Brazilía	Βραζιλία	Vrazilía	vraziˈlia	Brazil
Βραζίλια	Brazília	Μπραζίλια	Βrazília	bra'ziʎa	Brasília
Βραυρών	Braurṓn	Βραυρώνα	Vravróna	vravˈrona	Brauron
Βρεντέσιον	Brentésion	Βρεντέσιο	Vrentésio	vreˈdesio	Brundisium; Brindisi
Βρίξιλλον	Bríksillon	Βρίξιλλο	Vríxillo	ˈvriksilo	Brixellum
Βρυξέλλαι	Brykséllai	Βρυξέλλες	Vryxélles	vriˈkseles	Brussels
Βύβλος	Býblos	Βύβλος	Vývlos	ˈvivlos	Byblos; Gubla; Gebal; Jbeil
Βυζάντιον	Byzántion	Βυζάντιο	Vyzántio	vi'zadio	Byzantium; New Rome; Constantinople; Istanbul

=== Γ ===
Classical/Katharevousa		Modern Greek			English; Modern name
Greek alphabet	Transliteration	Greek alphabet	Transliteration	IPA	English; Modern name
Γαλιλαία	Galilaía	Γαλιλαία	Galilaía	ɣaliˈlea	Galilea; Galilee
Γαλλία	Gallía	Γαλλία	Gallía	ɣaˈlia	France; Gaul
Γανυμήδης	Ganymḗdēs	Γανυμήδης	Ganymídis	ɣaniˈmiðis	Ganymede
Γαρούνας	Garoúnas	Γαρούνας	Garoúnas	ɣaˈrunas	Garonne
Γαύδος	Gaúdos	Γαύδος	Gávdos	ˈɣavðos	Gavdos
Γέλα	Géla	Γέλα	Géla	ˈʝela	Gela
Γένουα	Génoua	Γένοβα	Génova	ˈʝenova	Genoa
Γερμανία	Germanía	Γερμανία	Germanía	ʝermaˈnia	Germany; Deutschland
Γεροντία	Gerontía	Γιούρα	Gioúra	ˈʝura	Gerontia; Gioura
Γεωργία	Geōrgía	Γεωργία	Georgía	ʝeorˈʝia	Georgia
Γῆ, Γαῖα	Gê, Gaîa	Γη, Γαία	Gi, Gaia	ˈʝi, 'ʝea	Earth
Γολγοθᾶ	Golgothâ	Γολγοθάς	Golgothás	ɣolɣoˈθas	Golgotha
Γόμοῤῥα	Gómorrha	Γόμορρα	Gómorra	ˈɣomora	Gomorrah
Γόρτυς	Górtys	Γόρτυνα	Górtyna	ˈɣortina	Gortyn
Γρανικός	Granikós	Γρανικός	Granikós	ɣraniˈkos	Granicus
Γρεβενά	Grebená	Γρεβενά	Grevená	ɣreveˈna	Grevena
Γύαρος	Gýaros	Γυάρος	Gyáros	ˈʝaros	Gyaros
Γύθειον	Gýtheion	Γύθειο	Gýtheio	ˈʝiθio	Gythium

=== Δ ===
Classical/Katharevousa		Modern Greek			English
Greek alphabet	Transliteration	Greek alphabet	Transliteration	IPA	English
Δακία	Dakía	Δακία	Dakía	ðaˈcia	Dacia
Δαλματία	Dalmatía	Δαλματία	Dalmatía	ðalmaˈtia	Dalmatia
Δαμασκός	Damaskós	Δαμασκός	Damaskós	ðamaˈskos	Damascus
Δαρδανέλλια	Dardanéllia	Δαρδανέλλια	Dardanéllia	ðarðaˈneʎa	Dardanelles
Δάρδανος	Dárdanos	Δάρδανος	Dárdanos	ˈðarðanos	Dardanus
Δασκύλειον	Daskýleion	Δασκύλιο	Daskýlio	ðasˈcilio	Dascylium
Δαυλίς	Daulís	Δαυλίδα	Davlída	ðavˈliða	Daulis
Δάφναι	Dáphnai	Δάφνες	Dáfnes	'ðafnes	Daphnae
Δεκάπολις	Dekápolis	Δεκάπολη	Dekápoli	ðeˈkapoli	Decapolis
Δεκέλεια	Dekéleia	Δεκέλεια	Dekéleia	ðeˈcelia	Decelea; Dhekelia
Δελφοί	Delphoí	Δελφοί	Delfoí	ðelˈfi	Delphi
Δῆλος	Dêlos	Δήλος	Dílos	ˈðilos	Delos
Ζεύς (gen. Διός/Ζηνός	Zeus	Δίας	Días	ˈðias	Jupiter
Δίδυμα	Dídyma	Δίδυμα	Dídyma	ˈðiðima	Didyma; Yenihisar
Δίνδυμον	Díndymon	Δίνδυμο	Díndymo	ˈðinðimo	Dindymon
Δρέπανα	Drépana	Τράπανι	Trápani	ˈtrapani	Trapani
Δρέπανον	Drépanon	Τράπανι	Trápani	ˈtrapani	Trapani
Δρυμούσσα	Drymoússa	Εγγλεζονήσι	Englezonísi	eŋglezoˈnisi	Drymoussa; Englezonisi; Uzunada
Δύμη	Dýmē	Δύμη	Dými	ˈðimi	Dyme
Δυῤῥάχιον	Dyrrhákhion	Δυρράχιο	Dyrráchio	ðiˈraçio	Dyrrachium; Durrës
Δωδεκάνησα	Dōdekánēsa	Δωδεκάνησα	Dodekánisa	ðoðeˈkanisa	Dodecanese
Δωδώνη	Dōdṓnē	Δωδώνη	Dodóni	ðoˈðoni	Dodona
Δωρίς	Dōrís	Δωρίδα	Dorída	ðoˈriða	Doris

=== Ε ===
Classical/Katharevousa		Modern Greek			English
Greek alphabet	Transliteration	Greek alphabet	Transliteration	IPA	English
Ἔδεσσα	Édessa	Έδεσσα	Édessa	'eðesa	Edessa; Şanlıurfa
Ἐλαία	Elaía	Ελαία	Elaía	eˈlea	Elaea; Kazıkbağları
Ἐλαφόνησος	Elaphónēsos	Ελαφόνησος	Elafónisos	elaˈfonisos	Elafonisos
Ἑλουητία	Helouētía	Ελβετία	Elvetía	elveˈtia	Helvetia; Switzerland
Ἐλέα	Eléa	Ελέα	Eléa	eˈlea	Elea; Velia
Ἐλευθεραί	Eleutheraí	Ελευθερές	Eleftherés	elefθeˈres	Eleutherae
Ἐλευσίς	Eleusís	Ελεύσινα	Elefsína	elefˈsina	Eleusis
Ἐλεφαντίνη	Elephantínē	Ελεφαντίνη	Elefantíni	elefaˈdini	Elephantine
Ἑλίκη	Helíkē	Ελίκη	Elíki	eˈlici	Helike
Ἑλλάς	Hellás	Ελλάδα	Elláda	eˈlaða	Hellas; Greece
Ἑλλήσποντος	Hellḗspontos	Ελλήσποντος	Ellíspontos	eˈlispodos	Hellespont
Ἐμπόριον	Empórion	Εμπόριο	Empório	eˈborio	Emporium; Empúries
Ἐπίδαμνος	Epídamnos	Επίδαμνος	Epídamnos	eˈpiðamnos	Epidamnus; Dyrrhachium; Durrës
Ἐπίδαυρος	Epídauros	Επίδαυρος	Epídavros	eˈpiðavros	Epidaurus
Ἑπτάνησα	Heptánēsa	Επτάνησα	Eptánisa	e'ptanisa	Heptanese
Ἐρέτρια	Erétria	Ερέτρια	Erétria	eˈretria	Eretria
Ἐρινεός	Erineós	Ερινεός	Erineós	erineˈos	Erineus
Ἑρμῆς	Hermês	Ερμής	Ermís	erˈmis	Mercury
Ἑρμιόνη	Hermiónē	Ερμιόνη	Ermióni	ermiˈoni	Hermione
Ἕρμος	Hérmos	Έρμος	Érmos	ˈermos	Hermus
Ἑρμούπολις	Hermoúpolis	Ερμούπολη	Ermoúpoli	erˈmupoli	Hermoupolis
Ἐρυθρὰ Θάλαττα	Erythrà Thálatta	Ερυθρά Θάλασσα	Erythrá Thálassa	eriˈθra ˈθalasa	Red Sea
Ἐρυθραί	Erythraí	Ερυθρές	Erythrés	eriˈθres	Erythrae; Litri
Ἐρυθραία	Erythraía	Ερυθραία	Erythraía	eriˈθrea	Erythraea; Eritrea
Ἐρύμανθος	Erúmanthos	Ερύμανθος	Erýmanthos	eˈrimanθos	Erymanthus
Ἔρυξ	Éryks	Έρυκας	Érykas	ˈerikas	Eryx; Erice
Εὔβοια	Eúboia	Εύβοια	Évvoia	ˈevia	Euboea
Εὔηνος	Eúēnos	Εύηνος	Évinos	ˈevinos	Evenus
Εὔξεινος Πόντος	Eúkseinos Póntos	Εύξεινος Πόντος	Éfxeinos Póntos	ˈefksinos poˈdos	Euxine Sea
Εὐρυμέδων	Eurymédōn	Ευρυμέδων	Evrymédon	evriˈmeðon	Eurymedon; Köprüçay
Εὔριπος	Eúripos	Εύριπος	Évripos	ˈevripos	Euripus
Εὐρυτανία	Eurytanía	Ευρυτανία	Evrytanía	evritaˈnia	Eurytania
Εὔρωμος	Eúrōmos	Εύρωμος	Évromos	ˈevromos	Euromus
Εὐρώπη	Eurṓpē	Ευρώπη	Evrópi	eˈvropi	Europe; Europa
Εὐρώτας	Eurṓtas	Ευρώτας	Evrótas	eˈvrotas	Eurotas
Εὐφράτης	Euphrátēs	Ευφράτης	Effrátis	eˈfratis	Euphrates
Ἔφεσος	Éphesos	Έφεσος	Éfesos	ˈefesos	Ephesus; Selçuk
Ἐχινάδες	Ekhinádes	Εχινάδες	Echinádes	eçiˈnaðes	Echinades

=== Ζ ===
Classical/Katharevousa		Modern Greek			English
Greek alphabet	Transliteration	Greek alphabet	Transliteration	IPA	English
Ζάβατος	Zábatos	Ζάβατος	Závatos	ˈzavatos	Zab, may refer to Great Zab or Little Zab
Ζάγκλη	Zánklē	Ζάγκλη	Zágkli	zaˈɡli	Zancle; Messina
Ζάκυνθος	Zákynthos	Ζάκυνθος	Zákynthos	ˈzacinθos	Zacynthus; Zakynthos; Zante
Ζεύγμα	Zeúgma	Ζεύγμα	Zévgma	ˈzevɣma	Zeugma

=== Η ===
Classical/Katharevousa		Modern Greek			English
Greek alphabet	Transliteration	Greek alphabet	Transliteration	IPA	English
Ἡγουμενίτσα	Hēgoumenítsa	Ηγουμενίτσα	Igoumenítsa	iɣumeˈnitsa	Igoumenitsa
Ἠδωνίς	Ēdōnís	Ηδωνίδα	Idonída	iðoˈniða	Edonis
Ἥλιος	Hḗlios	Ήλιος	Ílios	ˈiʎos	Sun
Ἡλιούπολις	Hēlioúpolis	Ηλιούπολη	Ilioúpoli	iˈʎupoli	Heliopolis
Ἦλις	Êlis	Ήλιδα	Ílida	ˈiliða	Elis
Ἠλύσιον	Ēlúsion	Ηλύσιο	Ilýsio	iˈlisio	Elysium
Ἡμαθία	Hēmathía	Ημαθία	Imathía	imaˈθia	Hemathia
Ἡνωμέναι Πολιτεῖαι	Hēnōménai Politeîai	Ηνωμένες Πολιτείες	Inoménes Politeíes	inoˈmenes poliˈties	United States
Ἡνωμένον Βασίλειον	Hēnōménon Basíleion	Ηνωμένο Βασίλειο	Inoméno Vasíleio	inoˈmeno vaˈsilio	United Kingdom
Ἤπειρος	Ḗpeiros	Ήπειρος	Ípeiros	ˈipiros	Epirus
Ἡραία	Hēraía	Ηραία	Iraía	iˈrea	Heraea
Ἡράκλανον	Hēráklanon	Ηράκλανο	Iráklano	iˈraklano	Herculaneum; Ercolano
Ἡράκλεια	Hērákleia	Ηράκλεια	Irákleia	iˈraklia	Heraclea; Ereğli
Ἡράκλειον	Hērákleion	Ηράκλειο	Irákleio	iˈraklio	Heraklion
Ἠριδανός	Ēridanós	Ηριδανός	Iridanós	iriðaˈnos	Eridanus; Padus; Po

=== Θ ===
Classical/Katharevousa		Modern Greek			English
Greek alphabet	Transliteration	Greek alphabet	Transliteration	IPA	English
Θάσος	Thásos	Θάσος	Thásos	ˈθasos	Thasos
Θάψακος	Thápsakos	Θάψακος	Thápsakos	ˈθapsakos	Thapsacus
Θάψος	Thápsos	Θάψος	Thápsos	ˈθapsos	Thapsus
Θεάγγελα	Theángela	Θεάγγελα	Theángela	θeˈaɟela	Theangela; Etrim
Θεοδωσία	Theodōsía	Θεοδωσία	Theodosía	θeoðoˈsia	Theodosia
Θέρμη	Thérmē	Θέρμη	Thérmi	ˈθermi	Therma
Θερμοπύλαι	Thermopýlai	Θερμοπύλες	Thermopýles	θermoˈpiles	Thermopylae
Θερμώδων	Thermṓdōn	Θερμώδων	Thermódon	θerˈmoðon	Thermodon; Terme
Θεσπιαί	Thespiaí	Θεσπιές	Thespiés	θespiˈes	Thespiae
Θεσπρωτίς	Thesprōtís	Θεσπρωτία	Thesprotía	θesproˈtia	Thesprotis; Thesprotia
Θεσσαλία	Thessalía	Θεσσαλία	Thessalía	θesaˈlia	Thessaly
Θεσσαλονίκη	Thessaloníkē	Θεσσαλονίκη	Thessaloníki	θesaloˈnici	Salonica; Thessaloniki Thessalonica
Θῆβαι	Thêbai	Θήβα	Thíva	ˈθiva	Thebes
Θήρα	Thḗra	Θήρα	Thíra	ˈθira	Thera
Θηρασία	Thērasía	Θηρασία	Thirasía	θiraˈsia	Therasia
Θίσβαι	Thísbai	Θίσβες	Thísves	ˈθizves	Thisbae
Θούριοι	Thoúrioi	Θούριοι	Thoúrioi	ˈθurii	Thurii
Θρᾴκη	Thrāíkē	Θράκη	Thráki	ˈθraci	Thrace; Trakya; Trakija
Θρία	Thría	Θρία	Thría	ˈθria	Thria
Θυάτειρα	Thyáteira	Θυάτειρα	Thyáteira	θiˈatira	Thyateira; Akhisar
Θύμαινα	Thýmaina	Θύμαινα	Thýmaina	ˈθimena	Thymaina
Θύμβρα	Thýmbra	Θύμβρα	Thýmvra	ˈθimvra	Thymbra
Θυνία	Thynía	Θυνία	Thynía	θiˈnia	Thynia
Θυρέα	Thyréa	Θυρέα	Thyréa	θiˈrea	Thyrea

=== Ι ===
Classical/Katharevousa		Modern Greek			English
Greek alphabet	Transliteration	Greek alphabet	Transliteration	IPA	English
Ἰαλυσσός	Ialyssós	Ιαλυσσός	Ialyssós	jaliˈsos	Ialyssos
Ἰανοῦκλον	Ianoûklon	Ιανούκλο	Ianoúklo	jaˈnuklo	Janiculum; Gianicolo
Ἰαπυγία	Iapygía	Ιαπυγία	Iapygía	japiˈʝia	Salento
Ἰβηρία	Ibēría	Ιβηρία	Iviría	iviˈria	Iberia; Iberia
Ἴδη	Ídē	Ίδη	Ídi	ˈiði	Ida
Ἰδουμαία	Idoumaía	Ιδουμαία	Idoumaía	iðuˈmea	Edom; Idumaea
Ἱερά	Hierá	Ιερά	Ierá	jeˈra	Vulcano
Ἱεριχῶ	Hierikhô	Ιεριχώ	Ierichó	jeriˈxo	Jericho
Ἰέρνη	Iérnē	Ιρλανδία	Irlandía	irlanˈðia	Hibernia; Ireland
Ἱερουσαλήμ	Hierousalḗm	Ιερουσαλήμ	Ierousalím	jerusaˈlim	Jerusalem
Ἱεροσόλυμα	Hierosólyma	Ιεροσόλυμα	Ierosólyma	jeroˈsolima	Jerusalem
Ἰθάκη	Ithákē	Ιθάκη	Itháki	iˈθaci	Ithaca
Ἰθώμη	Ithṓmē	Ιθώμη	Ithómi	iˈθomi	Ithome
Ἰκαρία	Ikaría	Ικαρία	Ikaría	ikaˈria	Icaria
Ἰκόνιον	Ikónion	Ικόνιο	Ikónio	iˈkoɲo	Iconium; Konya
Ἴλιον	Ílion	Ίλιο	Ílio	ˈiʎo	Ilium; Troy
Ἰλισός	Ilisós	Ιλισός	Ilisós	iliˈsos	Ilissus
Ἰλλυρία	Illyría	Ιλλυρία	Illyría	iliˈria	Illyria
Ἴμβρος	Ímbros	Ίμβρος	Ímvros	ˈimvros	Imbros; Gökçeada
Ἱμέρα	Himéra	Ιμέρα	Iméra	iˈmera	Himera
Ἰνδῖαι	Indîai	Ινδία	Indía	inˈðia	India; Indies
Ἰνδονησία	Indonēsía	Ινδονησία	Indonisía	inðoniˈsia	Indonesia
Ἰόνιοι Νῆσοι	Iónioi Nêsoi	Ιόνια Νησιά	Iónia Nisiá	iˈoɲa nisiˈa	Ionian Islands
᾿Ιόππη	Ióppē	Γιάφα	Giáfa	ˈɣafa	Joppa; Jaffa
Ἴος	Íos	Ίος	Íos	ˈios	Ios
Ἰουδαία	Ioudaía	Ιουδαία	Ioudaía	juˈðea	Judaea
Ἰσθμός	Isthmós	Ισθμός	Isthmós	isˈθmos	Isthmus
Ἰσμηνός	Ismēnós	Ισμηνός	Isminós	izmiˈnos	Ismenus
Ἱσπανία	Hispanía	Ισπανία	Ispanía	ispaˈnia	Spain; España
Ἰσραήλ	Israḗl	Ισραήλ	Israḯl	izraˈil	Israel
Ἰσσοί	Issoí	Ισσοί	Issoí	iˈsi	Issus
Ἰστρία	Istría	Ιστρία	Istría	isˈtria	Istria
Ἰστώνη	Istṓnē	Ιστώνη	Istóni	isˈtoni	Istone
Ἰταλία	Italía	Ιταλία	Italía	itaˈlia	Italy
Ἰῶ	Iô	Ιώ	Ió	iˈo	Io
Ἰωάννινα	Iōánnina	Ιωάννινα	Ioánnina	joˈanina	Ioannina
Ἰωαννούπολις	Iōannoúpolis	Ιωαννούπολη	Ioannoúpoli	joaˈnupoli	Johannesburg
Ἰωλκός	Iōlkós	Ιωλκός	Iolkós	jolˈkos	Iolcos
Ἰωνία	Iōnía	Ιωνία	Ionía	joˈnia	Ionia

=== Κ ===
Classical/Katharevousa		Modern Greek			English
Greek alphabet	Transliteration	Greek alphabet	Transliteration	IPA	English
Καβάλλα	Kabálla	Καβάλα	Kavála	kaˈvala	Kavala
Καδμεία	Kadmeía	Καδμεία	Kadmeía	kaðˈmia	Cadmea
Καζακστάν	Kazakstán	Καζακστάν	Kazakstán	kazakˈstan	Kazakhstan
Κάϊκος	Káïkos	Κάικος	Káikos	ˈkaikos	Caicus; Bakırçay
Καισάρεια	Kaisáreia	Καισάρεια	Kaisáreia	ceˈsaria	Caesarea
Καλαβρία	Kalabría	Καλαβρία	Kalavría	kalaˈvria	Calabria
Καλαμᾶται	Kalamâtai	Καλαμάτα	Kalamáta	kalaˈmata	Kalamata
Καληδονία	Kalēdonía	Καληδονία	Kalidonía	kaliðoˈnia	Caledonia; Scotland
Καλλίπολις	Kallípolis	Καλλίπολη	Kallípoli	kaˈlipoli	Gallipoli; Gelibolu
Καλλιστῶ	Kallistô	Καλλιστώ	Kallistó	kaliˈsto	Callisto
Κάλπη	Kálpē	Κάλπη	Kálpi	ˈkalpi	Gibraltar
Καλυδών	Kalydṓn	Καλυδών	Kalydón	kaliˈðon	Calydon
Κάλυμνος	Kálymnos	Κάλυμνος	Kálymnos	ˈkalimnos	Calymnus; Kalymnos
Καμάρινα	Kamárina	Καμάρινα	Kamárina	kaˈmarina	Camarina
Κάμειρος	Kámeiros	Κάμειρος	Kámeiros	ˈkamiros	Camirus; Kameiros
Καμπανία	Kampanía	Καμπανία	Kampanía	kabaˈnia	Campania
Καμπέρα	Kampéra	Καμπέρα	Kampéra	kaˈbera	Canberra
Καναδᾶς	Kanadâs	Καναδάς	Kanadás	kanaˈðas	Canada
Κάνναι	Kánnai	Κάννες	Kánnes	ˈkanes	Cannae; Canne della Battaglia
Κανύσιον	Kanýsion	Κανύσιο	Kanýsio	kaˈnisio	Canusium; Canosa
Κάνωβος	Kánōbos	Κάνωβος	Kánovos	ˈkanovos	Canopus
Καππαδοκία	Kappadokía	Καππαδοκία	Kappadokía	kapaðoˈcia	Cappadocia
Καπύη	Kapýē	Καπύη	Kapýi	kaˈpi.i	Capua
Καρδίτσα	Kardítsa	Καρδίτσα	Kardítsa	karˈðitsa	Karditsa
Καρία	Karía	Καρία	Karía	kaˈria	Caria
Κάρπαθος	Kárpathos	Κάρπαθος	Kárpathos	ˈkarpaθos	Carpathus; Karpathos
Κάῤῥαι	Kárrhai	Κάρρες	Kárres	ˈkares	Carrhae; Harran
Καρύανδα	Karýanda	Καρύανδα	Karýanda	kaˈrianða	Caryanda
Κάρυστος	Kárystos	Κάρυστος	Kárystos	ˈkaristos	Carystus
Καρχηδών	Karkhēdṓn	Καρχηδόνα	Karchidóna	karçiˈðona	Carthage
Κάσος	Kásos	Κάσος	Kásos	ˈkasos	Kasos
Κασπία	Kaspía	Κασπία	Kaspía	kaˈspia	Caspian Sea; Qazvin
Καστελλόριζον	Kastellórizon	Καστελλόριζο	Kastellórizo	kasteˈlorizo	Castelrosso; Kastellorizo
Καστοριά	Kastoriá	Καστοριά	Kastoriá	kastorˈia	Kastoria
Κατάνη	Katánē	Κατάνη	Katáni	kaˈtani	Catania
Καύκασος	Kaúkasos	Καύκασος	Káfkasos	ˈkafkasos	Caucasus
Καῦνος	Kaûnos	Καύνος	Kávnos	ˈkavnos	Caunus
Κάϋστρος	Káüstros	Κάυστρος	Káystros	ˈkaistros	Cayster; Küçük Menderes
Κεγχρειαί	Kenkhreiaí	Κεχριές	Kechriés	cexriˈes	Cenchrea; Kechries
Κέϊπ Τάουν	Kéïp Táoun	Κέιπ Τάουν	Kéip Táoun	ˈceip ˈtaun	Cape Town
Κελαιναί	Kelainaí	Κελαινές	Kelainés	celeˈnes	Celaenae
Κέραμος	Kéramos	Κέραμος	Kéramos	ˈceramos	Ceramus
Κερασοῦς	Kerasoûs	Κερασούντα	Kerasoúnta	cerasuˈda	Cerasus; Kerasunt; Giresun
Κέρκυρα	Kérkyra	Κέρκυρα	Kérkyra	ˈcercira	Corcyra; Corfu
Κεφαλληνία	Kephallēnía	Κεφαλονιά	Kefaloniá	cefaloˈɲa	Cephalonia
Κέως	Kéōs	Κέα	Kéa	ˈcea	Ceos; Kea
Κηφισός	Kēphisós	Κηφισός	Kifisós	cifiˈsos	Cephissus
Κίεβον	Kíebon	Κίεβο	Kíevo	ˈcievo	Kyiv
Κιθαιρών	Kithairṓn	Κιθαιρών	Kithairón	ciθeˈron	Cithaeron
Κιλικία	Kilikía	Κιλικία	Kilikía	ciliˈcia	Cilicia
Κιλκίς	Kilkís	Κιλκίς	Kilkís	cilˈcis	Cilcis
Κιμμερία	Kimmería	Κιμμερία	Kimmería	cimeˈria	Cimmeria
Κίμωλος	Kímōlos	Κίμωλος	Kímolos	ˈcimolos	Kimolos
Κίτιον	Kítion	Κίτιο	Kítio	ˈcitio	Citium; Kittim; Larnaca
Κλαζομεναί	Klazomenaí	Κλαζομενές	Klazomenés	klazomeˈnes	Clazomenae; Urla Iskele
Κλάρος	Kláros	Κλάρος	Kláros	ˈklaros	Clarus
Κλεωναί	Kleōnaí	Κλεωνές	Kleonés	kleoˈnes	Cleonae
Κλούσιον	Kloúsion	Κλούσιο	Kloúsio	ˈklusio	Clusium
Κνίδος	Knídos	Κνίδος	Knídos	ˈkniðos	Cnidus; Knidos; Tekir
Κνωσσός	Knōssós	Κνωσός	Knosós	knoˈsos	Cnossus; Knossos
Κοζάνη	Kozánē	Κοζάνη	Kozáni	koˈzani	Kozani
Κολοσσαί	Kolossaí	Κολοσσές	Kolossés	koloˈses	Colossae
Κολοφῶν	Kolophôn	Κολοφών	Kolofón	koloˈfon	Colophon; Değirmendere
Κολχίς	Kolkhís	Κολχίδα	Kolchída	kolˈçiða	Colchis
Κολωναί	Kolōnaí	Κολωνές	Kolonés	koloˈnes	Colonae
Κολωνία	Kolōnía	Κολωνία	Kolonía	koloˈnia	Cologne (Köln)
Κομμαγηνή	Kommagēnḗ	Κομμαγηνή	Kommaginí	komaʝiˈni	Commagene
Κορδύβη	Kordýbē	Κορδύβη	Kordývi	korˈðivi	Corduba; Córdoba
Κόρινθος	Kόrinthos	Κόρινθος	Kόrinthos	ˈkorinθos	Corinth
Κορσική	Korsikḗ	Κορσική	Korsikí	korsiˈci	Corsica
Κορώνεια	Korṓneia	Κορώνεια	Koróneia	koˈronia	Coronea
Κούναξα	Koúnaksa	Κούναξα	Koúnaxa	ˈkunaksa	Cunaxa
Κούριον	Koúrion	Κούριο	Koúrio	ˈkurio	Curium
Κραναά	Kranaá	Κραναά	Kranaá	kranaˈa	Cranaa; Athens
Κρήτη	Krḗtē	Κρήτη	Kríti	ˈkriti	Crete
Κριμαία	Krimaía	Κριμαία	Krimaía	kriˈmea	Crimea
Κρόνος	Krónos	Κρόνος	Krónos	ˈkronos	Saturn
Κρότων	Krótōn	Κρότωνα	Krótona	ˈkrotona	Croton
Κτησιφῶν	Ktēsiphôn	Κτησιφών	Ktisifón	ktisiˈfon	Ctesiphon
Κύδνος	Kýdnos	Κύδνος	Kýdnos	ˈciðnos	Cydnus
Κυδωνία	Kydōnía	Κυδωνία	Kydonía	ciðoˈnia	Cydonia
Κύζικος	Kýzikos	Κύζικος	Kýzikos	ˈcizikos	Cyzicus
Κύθηρα	Kýthēra	Κύθηρα	Kýthira	ˈciθira	Cythera; Cerigo
Κύθνος	Kýthnos	Κύθνος	Kýthnos	ˈciθnos	Cythnus; Kythnos
Κυκλάδες	Kykládes	Κυκλάδες	Kykládes	ciˈklaðes	Cyclades
Κυλλήνη	Kyllḗnē	Κυλλήνη	Kyllíni	ciˈlini	Cyllene
Κύμη	Kýmē	Κύμη	Kými	ˈcimi	Cuma; Cyme; Cumae
Κύνθος	Kýnthos	Κύνθος	Kýnthos	ˈcinθos	Cynthus
Κυνὸς Κεφαλαί	Kynòs Kephalaí	Κυνός Κεφαλές	Kynós Kefalés	ciˈnos cefaˈles	Cynoscephalae
Κυνὸς Σῆμα	Kynòs Sêma	Κυνός Σήμα	Kynós Síma	ciˈnos ˈsima	Cynossema
Κυνουρία	Kynouría	Κυνουρία	Kynouría	cinuˈria	Cynuria
Κύπρος	Kýpros	Κύπρος	Kýpros	ˈcipros	Cyprus
Κυρηναϊκή	Kyrēnaïkḗ	Κυρηναϊκή	Kyrinaïkí	cirinaiˈci	Cyrenaica
Κυρήνη	Kyrḗnē	Κυρήνη	Kyríni	ciˈrini	Cyrene
Κύρνος	Kýrnos	Κύρνος	Kýrnos	ˈcirnos	Cyrnus; Corsica
Κωκυτός	Kōkytós	Κωκυτός	Kokytós	kociˈtos	Cocytus
Κωνσταντινούπολις	Kōnstantinoúpolis	Κωνσταντινούπολη	Konstantinoúpoli	kostadiˈnupoli	Constantinople; Istanbul
Κώς	Kṓs	Κως	Kos	kos	Kos
Καρδάμαινα	Kardamena	Καρδάμαινα	Kardamena	karˈðamena	Kardamena

=== Λ ===
Classical/Katharevousa		Modern Greek			English
Greek alphabet	Transliteration	Greek alphabet	Transliteration	IPA	English
Λαβίνιον	Labínion	Λαβίνιο	Lavínio	laˈvinio	Lavinium
Λαβράνδα	Labránda	Λαβράνδα	Lavránda	laˈvranða	Labranda
Λακεδαίμων	Lakedaímōn	Λακεδαίμονα	Lakedaímona	laceˈðemona	Lacedaemon
Λακωνία	Lakōnía	Λακωνία	Lakonía	lakoˈnia	Laconia
Λαμία	Lamía	Λαμία	Lamía	laˈmia	Lamia
Λάμψακος	Lámpsakos	Λάμψακος	Lámpsakos	lampˈsakos	Lampsacus
Λαοδίκεια	Laodíkeia	Λαοδίκεια	Laodíkeia	laoˈðicia	Laodicea; Latakia
Λάρισσα	Laríssa	Λάρισα	Larísa	ˈlarisa	Larissa
Λάρνακα	Lárnaka	Λάρνακα	Lárnaka	ˈlarnaka	Larnaca
Λαύριον	Laúrion	Λαύριο	Lávrio	ˈlavrio	Laurium
Λέβεδος	Lébedos	Λέβεδος	Lévedos	ˈleveðos	Lebedus
Λείγηρ	Leígēr	Λείγηρας	Leígiras	ˈliʝiras	Loire
Λειψοί	Leipsoí	Λειψοί	Leipsoí	lipˈsi	Lipsi
Λεοντῖνοι	Leontînoi	Λεοντίνοι	Leontínoi	leoˈdini	Leontini; Lentini
Λέπρεον	Lépreon	Λέπρεο	Lépreo	ˈlepreo	Lepreum
Λέρνη	Lérnē	Λέρνη	Lérni	ˈlerni	Lerna
Λέρος	Léros	Λέρος	Léros	ˈleros	Leros
Λέσβος	Lésbos	Λέσβος	Lésvos	ˈlezvos	Lesbos
Λευκανία	Leukanía	Λευκανία	Lefkanía	lefkaˈnia	Lucania
Λευκάς	Leukás	Λευκάδα	Lefkáda	lefˈkaða	Leucas; Lefkada
Λευκετία	Leuketía	Λευκετία	Lefketía	lefceˈtia	Leucetia; Paris
Λεύκτρα	Leúktra	Λεύκτρα	Léfktra	ˈlefktra	Leuctra
Λευκωσία	Leukōsía	Λευκωσία	Lefkosía	lefkoˈsia	Leucosia; Lefkoşa; Nicosia
Λέχαιον	Lékhaion	Λέχαιο	Léchaio	ˈleçeo	Lechaeum
Λήθη	Lḗthē	Λήθη	Líthi	ˈliθi	Lethe
Λῆμνος	Lêmnos	Λήμνος	Límnos	ˈlimnos	Lemnos
Λίβανος	Líbanos	Λίβανος	Lívana	ˈlivanos	Lebanon; Lubnān
Λιβύη	Libýē	Λιβύη	Livýï	liˈvi.i	Libya
Λιβυρνία	Libyrnía	Λιβυρνία	Livyrnía	livirˈnia	Liburnia
Λιγυστική	Ligystikḗ	Λιγυστική	Ligystikí	liʝistiˈci	Liguria
Λιλύβαιον	Lilýbaion	Λιλύβαιο	Lilývaio	liˈliveo	Lilybaeum; Marsala
Λίνδον	Líndon	Λίνδο	Líndo	ˈlinðo	Lindum Colonia; Lincoln
Λίνδος	Líndos	Λίνδος	Líndos	ˈlinðos	Lindos
Λιπάρα	Lipára	Λιπάρα	Lipára	liˈpara	Lipara; Lipari
Λίρις	Líris	Λίρις	Líris	ˈliris	Liris; Liri
Λοκρίς	Lokrís	Λοκρίδα	Lokrída	loˈkriða	Locris
Λοκροί	Lokroí	Λοκροί	Lokroí	loˈkri	Locri
Λονδίνη	Londínē	Λονδίνο	Londíno	lonˈðino	London
Λυκάβηττος	Lykábēttos	Λυκαβηττός	Lykavittós	likaviˈtos	Lycabettus
Λύκειον	Lýkeion	Λύκειο	Lýkeio	ˈlicio	Lyceum
Λούκη	Loúkē	Λούκη	Loúki	ˈluci	Lucca
Λυδία	Lydía	Λυδία	Lydía	liˈðia	Lydia
Λυκία	Lykía	Λυκία	Lykía	liˈcia	Lycia
Λυκαονία	Lykaonía	Λυκαονία	Lykaonía	likaoˈnia	Lycaonia
Λώρυμα	Lṓryma	Λώρυμα	Lóryma	ˈlorima	Loryma
Λυσιτανία	Lysitanía	Λυσιτανία	Lysitanía	lisitaˈnia	Lusitania

=== Μ ===
Classical/Katharevousa		Modern Greek			English
Greek alphabet	Transliteration	Greek alphabet	Transliteration	IPA	English
Μαγνησία	Magnēsía	Μαγνησία	Magnisía	maɣniˈsia	Magnesia
Μαίανδρος	Maíandros	Μαίανδρος	Maíandros	ˈmeanðros	Maeander; Büyük Menderes
Μαίναλον	Maínalon	Μαίναλο	Maínalo	ˈmenalo	Maenalus
Μαιονία	Maionía	Μαιονία	Maionía	meoˈnia	Maeonia; Lydia
Μαιῶτις	Maiôtis	Μαιώτιδα	Maiótida	meˈotiða	Maeotis; Sea of Azov
Μακεδονία	Makedonía	Μακεδονία	Makedonía	maceðoˈnia	Macedon; Macedonia
Μαλέα	Maléa	Μαλέα	Maléa	maˈlea	Malea
Μαντίνεια	Mantíneia	Μαντίνεια	Mantíneia	maˈdinia	Mantinea
Μαραθών	Marathṓn	Μαραθώνας	Marathónas	maraˈθonas	Marathon
Μαράκανδα	Marákanda	Μαράκανδα	Marákanda	maˈrakanða	Samarkand
Μαριούπολις	Marioúpolis	Μαριούπολη	Marioúpoli	mariˈupoli	Mariupol
Μασσαλία	Massalía	Μασσαλία	Massalía	masaˈlia	Marseille
Μαυρουσία	Maurousía	Μαυριτανία	Mavritanía	mavritaˈnia	Mauritania
Μαυροβούνιον	Mauroboúnion	Μαυροβούνιο	Mavrovoúnio	mavroˈvunio	Montenegro
Μεγάλη Βλαχία	Megálē Blakhía	Μεγάλη Βλαχία	Megáli Vlachía	meˈɣali vlaˈçia	Great Wallachia
Μεγάλη Ἑλλάς	Megálē Hellás	Μεγάλη Ελλάδα	Megáli Elláda	meˈɣali eˈlaða	Magna Graecia
Μεγαλόπολις	Megalópolis	Μεγαλόπολη	Megalópoli	meɣaˈlopoli	Megalopolis
Μεγανήσιον	Meganḗsion	Μεγανήσι	Meganísi	meɣaˈnisi	Meganissi
Μέγαρα	Mégara	Μέγαρα	Mégara	ˈmeɣara	Megara
Μεγαρίς	Megarís	Μεγαρίδα	Megarída	meɣaˈriða	Megaris
Μεγίστη	Megístē	Μεγίστη	Megísti	meˈʝisti	Megisti
Μεδιόλανον	Mediólanon	Μιλάνο	Miláno	miˈlano	Mediolanum; Milan
Μέθανα	Méthana	Μέθανα	Méthana	ˈmeθana	Methana
Μεθώνη	Methṓnē	Μεθώνη	Methóni	meˈθoni	Methone
Μελβούρνη	Melboúrnē	Μελβούρνη	Melvoúrni	melˈvurni	Melbourne
Μελίτη	Melítē	Μάλτα	Málta	ˈmalta	Melita; Malta
Μέμφις	Mémphis	Μέμφιδα	Mémfida	ˈmemfiða	Memphis
Μένδη	Méndē	Μένδη	Méndi	ˈmenði	Mende
Μεσολόγγιον	Mesolóngion	Μεσολόγγι	Mesolóngi	mesoˈloʝi	Missolonghi
Μεσοποταμία	Mesopotamía	Μεσοποταμία	Mesopotamía	mesopotaˈmia	Mesopotamia; Iraq
Μεσσαπία	Messapía	Μεσσαπία	Messapía	mesaˈpia	Messapia
Μεσσήνη	Messḗnē	Μεσσήνη	Messíni	meˈsini	Messina
Μεσσηνία	Messēnía	Μεσσηνία	Messinía	mesiˈnia	Messenia
Μεταπόντιον	Metapóntion	Μεταπόντιο	Metapóntio	metapodiˈo	Metapontum
Μέταυρος	Métauros	Μέταυρος	Métavros	ˈmetavros	Metaurus; Metauro
Μηδία	Mēdía	Μηδία	Midía	miˈðia	Media
Μήθυμνα	Mḗthymna	Μήθυμνα	Míthymna	ˈmiθimna	Methymna
Μηλίς	Mēlís	Μηλίδα	Milída	miˈliða	Malis
Μῆλος	Mêlos	Μήλος	Mílos	ˈmilos	Melos
Μικρονησία	Mikronēsía	Μικρονησία	Mikronisía	mikroniˈsia	Micronesia
Μίλητος	Mílētos	Μίλητος	Mílitos	ˈmilitos	Miletus; Milet
Μιντούρνη	Mintoúrnē	Μιντούρνη	Mintoúrni	miˈdurni	Minturnae; Minturno
Μινώα	Minṓa	Μινώα	Minóa	miˈnoa	Minoa
Μόγολα	Mógola	Μόγολα	Mógola	ˈmoɣola	Mogola; Muğla
Μοιρίς	Moirís	Μοιρίδα	Moirída	miˈriða	Moeris
Μοισία	Moisía	Μοισία	Moisía	miˈsia	Moesia
Μολοσσία	Molossía	Μολοσσία	Molossía	moloˈsia	Molossia
Μόναχον	Mónakho	Μόναχο	Mónacho	ˈmonaxo	Munich
Μόνοικος	Mónoikos	Μονακό	Monakó	monaˈko	Monoecus; Monaco
Μοντρεάλη	Montreálē	Μοντρεάλη	Montreáli	montreˈɣali	Montreal
Μόσχα	Móskha	Μόσχα	Móscha	ˈmosxa	Moscow
Μουνυχία	Mounykhía	Μουνυχία	Mounychía	muniˈçia	Munychia
Μυγδονία	Mygdonía	Μυγδονία	Mygdonía	miɣðoˈnia	Mygdonia
Μυζηθράς	Myzēthrás	Μυστράς	Mystrás	misˈtras	Myzethras; Mystras; Mistra
Μυκῆναι	Mykênai	Μυκήνες	Mykínes	miˈcines	Mycenae
Μύκονος	Mýkonos	Μύκονος	Mýkonos	ˈmikonos	Myconus; Mykonos
Μύλασα	Mýlasa	Μύλασα	Mýlasa	ˈmilasa	Mylasa; Milas
Μύνδος	Mýndos	Μύνδος	Mýndos	ˈminðos	Myndus; Gümüşlük
Μυοῦς	Myoûs	Μυούντα	Myoúnta	miˈuda	Myus; Avşar Kalesi
Μύρκινος	Mýrkinos	Μύρκινος	Mýrkinos	ˈmircinos	Myrcinus
Μύῤῥα	Mýrrha	Μύρρα	Mýrra	ˈmira	Smyrna; İzmir
Μυσία	Mysía	Μυσία	Mysía	miˈsia	Mysia
Μυτιλήνη	Mytilḗnē	Μυτιλήνη	Mytilíni	mitiˈlini	Mytilene
Μωρέας	Mōréas	Μωριάς	Moriás	morˈʝas	Morea

=== Ν ===
Classical/Katharevousa		Modern Greek			English
Greek alphabet	Transliteration	Greek alphabet	Transliteration	IPA	English
Ναζαρὲθ	Nazarèth	Ναζαρέτ	Nazarét	nazaˈret	Nazareth
Νάξος	Náksos	Νάξος	Náxos	ˈnaksos	Naxos
Νάρβων	Nárbōn	Νάρβων	Nárvon	ˈnarvon	Narbo; Narbonne
Ναύκρατις	Naúkratis	Ναύκρατις	Náfkratis	ˈnafkratis	Naucratis
Ναύπακτος	Naúpaktos	Ναύπακτος	Náfpaktos	ˈnafpaktos	Naupactus
Ναυπλία	Nauplía	Ναύπλιο	Náfplio	ˈnafpʎo	Nauplia; Nafplio
Νέα Νότιος Οὐαλλία	Néa Nótios Ouallía	Νέα Νότια Ουαλία	Néa Nótia Oualía	ˈnea ˈnotia uaˈlia	New South Wales
Νέα Ῥώμη	Néa Rhṓmē	Νέα Ρώμη	Néa Rómi	ˈnea ˈromi	New Rome; Constantinople; Istanbul
Νέα Ὑόρκη	Néa Hyórkē	Νέα Υόρκη	Néa Yórki	ˈnea ˈjorci	New York City
Νεάπολις	Neápolis	Νάπολη	Nápoli	ˈnapoli	Neapolis; Naples; Napoli
Νεῖλος	Neîlos	Νείλος	Neílos	ˈnilos	Nile
Νεμέα	Neméa	Νεμέα	Neméa	neˈmea	Nemea
Νεοκαισάρεια	Neokaisáreia	Νεοκαισάρεια	Neokaisáreia	neoceˈsaria	Neocaesarea; Niksar
Νέστος	Néstos	Νέστος	Néstos	ˈnestos	Nestus; Mesta
Νίκαια	Níkaia	Νίκαια	Níkaia	ˈnicea	Nicaea; Nice; İznik
Νικομήδεια	Nikomḗdeia	Νικομήδεια	Nikomídeia	nikoˈmiðia	Nicomedia; İzmit
Νικόπολις	Nikópolis	Νικόπολη	Nikópoli	niˈkopoli	Nicopolis
Νίνος	Nínos	Νίνος	Nínos	ˈninos	Ninus; Nineveh
Νίσαια	Nísaia	Νίσαια	Nísaia	ˈnisea	Nisaea
Νίσυρος	Nísuros	Νίσυρος	Nísyros	ˈnisiros	Nisyros
Νομαντία	Nomantía	Νομαντία	Nomantía	nomaˈdia	Numantia
Νότιον	Nótion	Νότιο	Nótio	ˈnotio	Notium
Νότιος Ἀφρική	Nótios Aphrikḗ	Νότια Αφρική	Nótia Afrikí	ˈnotia afriˈci	South Africa
Νουμιδία	Noumidía	Νουμιδία	Noumidía	numiˈðia	Numidia
Ντητρόιτ	Ntētróit	Ντητρόιτ	Ntitróit	diˈtroit	Detroit
Νῦσα	Nûsa	Νύσα	Nýsa	ˈnisa	Nysa
Νῶλα	Nôla	Νώλα	Nóla	ˈnola	Nola

=== Ξ ===
Classical/Katharevousa		Modern Greek			English
Greek alphabet	Transliteration	Greek alphabet	Transliteration	IPA	English
Ξάνθη	Ksánthē	Ξάνθη	Xánthi	ˈksanθi	Xanthe; İskeçe

=== Ο ===
Classical/Katharevousa		Modern Greek			English
Greek alphabet	Transliteration	Greek alphabet	Transliteration	IPA	English
Ὀδησσός	Odēssós	Οδησσός	Odissós	oðiˈsos	Odessos; Varna; Odessa
Ὄθρυς	Óthrys	Όθρυς	Óthrys	ˈoθris	Othrys
Οἰνιάδαι	Oiniádai	Οινιάδες	Oiniádes	iniˈaðes	Oeniadae
Οἰνοῦς	Oinoûs	Οινούντα	Oinoúnta	iˈnuda	Oenus; Oinounta
Οἰνοῦσσαι	Oinoûssai	Οινούσες	Oinoúses	iˈnuses	Oenussae; Oinoussais
Οἰνώνη	Oinṓnē	Οινώνη	Oinóni	iˈnoni	Oenone; Aegina
Οἴτη	Oítē	Οίτη	Oíti	ˈiti	Oeta
Ὄλπαι	Ólpai	Όλπες	Ólpes	ˈolpes	Olpae
Ὀλυμπία	Olympía	Ολυμπία	Olympía	oliˈbia	Olympia
Ὄλυμπος	Ólympos	Όλυμπος	Ólympos	ˈolibos	Olympus
Ὄλυνθος	Ólynthos	Όλυνθος	Ólynthos	ˈolinθos	Olynthus
Ὁμβρική	Ombrikḗ	Ουμβρία	Oumvría	umˈvria	Umbria
Ὁμηρούπολις	Homēroúpolis	Ομηρούπολη	Omiroúpoli	omiˈrupoli	Homeropolis; Omiroupoli
Ὄνειον	Óneion	Όνειο	Óneio	ˈonio	Oneum
Ὀποῦς	Opoûs	Οπούντα	Opoúnta	oˈpuda	Opus
Ὀρόντης	Oróntēs	Ορόντης	Oróntis	oˈrodis	Orontes
Ὄσσα	Óssa	Όσσα	Óssa	ˈosa	Ossa
Ὀττάβα	Ottába	Οττάβα	Ottáva	otˈava	Ottawa
Οὐάσιγκτον	Ouásinkton	Ουάσινγκτον	Ouásingkton	uˈasiŋ(ɡ)ton	Washington, D.C.
Οὐκρανία	Oukranía	Ουκρανία	Oukranía	ukraˈnia	Ukraine; Ukrajina
Οὐρανός	Ouranós	Ουρανός	Ouranós	uraˈnos	Heaven; Uranus
Οφιούσα	Ophioúsa	Αφησία	Afisía	afiˈsia	Aphisia; Avşa; Türkeli Adası

=== Π ===
Classical/Katharevousa		Modern Greek			English
Greek alphabet	Transliteration	Greek alphabet	Transliteration	IPA	English
Παγασαί	Pagasaí	Παγασές	Pagasés	paɣaˈses	Pagasae
Παγγαία	Pangaía	Παγγαία	Pangaía	paɲˈʝea	Pangaea
Παγγαῖος	Pangaîos	Παγγαίος	Pangaíos	paɲˈʝeos	Pangaeus
Πάδος	Pádos	Πάδος	Pádos	ˈpaðos	Padus; Po
Παιονία	Paionía	Παιονία	Paionía	peoˈnia	Paionia
Πακτωλός	Paktōlós	Πακτωλός	Paktolós	paktoˈlos	Pactolus
Παλαιστίνη	Palaistínē	Παλαιστίνη	Palaistíni	palesˈtini	Palestine
Παλάτιον	Palátion	Παλάτιο	Palátio	paˈlatio	Palatine Hill
Παλλάντιον	Pallántion	Παλλάντιο	Pallántio	paˈladio	Pallantium
Παλλήνη	Pallḗnē	Παλλήνη	Pallíni	paˈlini	Pallene
Παμφυλία	Pamphylía	Παμφυλία	Pamfylía	pamfiˈli.a	Pamphylia
Πανιώνιον	Paniṓnion	Πανιώνιο	Paniónio	paniˈonio	Panionium
Παννονία	Pannonía	Παννονία	Pannonía	panoˈnia	Pannonia
Πάνορμος	Pánormos	Παλέρμο	Palérmo	paˈlermo	Panormus; Palermo
Παντικαπαῖον	Pantikapaîon	Παντικαπαίο	Pantikapaío	padikaˈpeo	Panticapaeum
Παξοί	Paksoí	Παξοί	Paxoí	pakˈsi	Paxos; Paxi
Πάραλος	Páralos	Πάραλος	Páralos	ˈparalos	Paralus
Παρθία	Parthía	Παρθία	Parthía	parˈθia	Parthia
Παρίσιοι	Parísioi	Παρίσι	Parísi	paˈrisi	Paris
Παρνασός	Parnasós	Παρνασός	Parnasós	parnaˈsos	Parnassus
Πάρνης	Párnēs	Πάρνηθα	Párnitha	ˈparniθa	Parnes; Parnitha
Πάρος	Páros	Πάρος	Páros	ˈparos	Paros
Παρθενῶν	Parthenôn	Παρθενώνας	Parthenónas	parθeˈnonas	Parthenon
Παρθένιος	Parthénios	Παρθένιος	Parthénios	parˈθenios	Parthenios; Bartın
Πασαργάδαι	Pasargádai	Πασαργάδες	Pasargádes	pasarˈɣaðes	Pasargadae
Πατάβιον	Patábion	Πατάβιο	Patávio	paˈtavio	Padua
Πάτμος	Pátmos	Πάτμος	Pátmos	ˈpatmos	Patmos
Πάτραι	Pátrai	Πάτρα	Pátra	ˈpatra	Patras
Παφλαγονία	Paphlagonía	Παφλαγονία	Paflagonía	paflaɣoˈnia	Paphlagonia
Πάφος	Páphos	Πάφος	Páfos	ˈpafos	Paphos; Baf
Πειραιεύς	Peiraieús	Πειραιάς	Peiraiás	pireˈas	Piraeus
Πειρήνη	Peirḗnē	Πειρήνη	Peiríni	piˈrini	Pirene
Πελασγία	Pelasgía	Πελασγία	Pelasgía	pelazˈʝia	Pelasgia
Πέλλα	Pélla	Πέλλα	Pélla	ˈpel(l)a	Pella
Πελλήνη	Pellḗnē	Πελλήνη	Pellíni	peˈlini	Pellene
Πελοπία	Pelopía	Θυάτειρα	Thyáteira	θiˈatira	Thyateira; Akhisar
Πελοπόννησος	Pelopónnēsos	Πελοπόννησος	Pelopónnisos	peloˈponisos	Peloponnese
Πέργαμον	Pérgamon	Πέργαμο	Pérgamo	ˈperɣamo	Pergamon; Bergama
Πέρινθος	Périnthos	Πέρινθος	Périnthos	ˈperinθos	Perinthus; Marmara Ereğli
Πεῤῥαιβία	Perrhaibía	Περραιβία	Perraivía	pereˈvia	Perrhaebia
Περσέπολις	Persépolis	Περσέπολη	Persépoli	perˈsepoli	Persepolis
Περσική	Persikḗ	Περσία	Persía	perˈsia	Persia
Πέτρα	Pétra	Πέτρα	Pétra	ˈpetra	Petra
Πηγαί	Pēgaí	Πηγές	Pigés	piˈʝes	Pegae
Πήλιον	Pḗlion	Πήλιο	Pílio	ˈpiʎo	Pelion
Πηλούσιον	Pēloúsion	Πηλούσιον	Piloúsio	piˈlusio	Pelusium
Πηνειός	Pēneiós	Πηνειός	Pineiós	piniˈos	Peneus
Πιερία	Piería	Πιερία	Piería	pieˈria	Pieria
Πιθηκοῦσαι	Pithēkoûsai	Πιθηκούσα	Pithikoúsa	piθiˈkusa	Pithecusae; Ischia
Πικηνίς	Pikēnís	Πικηνίδα	Pikinída	piciˈniða	Picenum
Πίνδος	Píndos	Πίνδος	Píndos	ˈpinðos	Pindus
Πῖσα	Pîsa	Πίσα	Písa	ˈpisa	Pisa
Πισιδία	Pisidía	Πισιδία	Pisidía	pisiˈðia	Pisidia
Πιτάνη	Pitánē	Πιτάνη	Pitáni	piˈtani	Pitane; Çandarlı
Πλακεντία	Plakentía	Πλακεντία	Plakentía	placeˈdia	Placentia; Piacenza
Πλάταια	Plátaia	Πλάταια	Plátaia	ˈplatea	Plataea
Πλειστός	Pleistós	Πλειστός	Pleistós	plisˈtos	Pleistus
Πλούτων	Ploútōn	Πλούτωνας	Ploútonas	ˈplutonas	Pluto
Πνύξ	Pnýks	Πνύκα	Pnýka	ˈpnika	Pnyx
Πολύγυρος	Polýgyros	Πολύγυρος	Polýgyros	poˈliʝiros	Polygyros
Πολυνησία	Polynēsía	Πολυνησία	Polynisía	poliniˈsia	Polynesia
Πομπήϊοι	Pompḗïoi	Πομπήιοι	Pompíioi	poˈbiii	Pompeii
Πόντος	Póntos	Πόντος	Póntos	ˈpodos	Pontus
Πόρος	Póros	Πόρος	Póros	ˈporos	Poros
Ποσειδῶν	Poseidôn	Ποσειδώνας	Poseidónas	posiˈðonas	Neptune
Ποτίδαια	Potídaia	Ποτίδαια	Potídaia	poˈtiðea	Potidaea
Ποτίολοι	Potíoloi	Ποτίολοι	Potíoloi	poˈtioli	Puteoli; Pozzuoli
Πραινεστόν	Prainestón	Πραινεστό	Prainestó	prenesˈto	Praeneste; Palestrina
Πραιτώρια	Praitṓria	Πραιτώρια	Praitória	preˈtoria	Pretoria
Πρασιαί	Prasiaí	Πρασιές	Prasiés	prasiˈes	Prasiae
Πρέβεζα	Prébezza	Πρέβεζα	Préveza	ˈpreveza	Preveza
Πριήνη	Priḗnē	Πριήνη	Priíni	priˈini	Priene; Güllübahçe
Προκόννησος	Prokónnēsos	Προκόννησος	Prokónnisos	proˈkonisos	Proconnesus; Marmara
Προποντίς	Propontís	Προποντίδα	Propontída	propoˈdiða	Propontis
Προῦσα	Proûsa	Προύσα	Proúsa	ˈprusa	Prousa; Bursa
Πτολεμαΐς	Ptolemaḯs	Πτολεμαΐδα	Ptolemaḯda	ptolemaˈiða	Ptolemais; Accho; Acre
Πύδνα	Pýdna	Πύδνα	Pýdna	ˈpiðna	Pydna
Πύλος	Pýlos	Πύλος	Pýlos	ˈpilos	Pylos
Πύργος	Pýrgos	Πύργος	Pýrgos	ˈpirɣos	Pyrgos; Burgas
Πυρηναία	Pyrēnaía	Πυρηναία	Pyrinaía	piriˈnea	Pyrenees

=== Ρ ===
Classical/Katharevousa		Modern Greek			English
Greek alphabet	Transliteration	Greek alphabet	Transliteration	IPA	English
Ῥάβεννα	Rhábenna	Ραβέννα	Ravénna	raˈvena	Ravenna
Ῥαμνοῦς	Rhamnoûs	Ραμνούντα	Ramnoúnta	ramˈnuda	Rhamnous
Ῥέθυμνον	Rhéthymnon	Ρέθυμνο	Réthymno	ˈreθimno	Rethymno
Ῥήγιον	Rhḗgion	Ρήγιο	Rígio	ˈriʝio	Rhegium; Reggio di Calabria
Ῥήνεια	Rhḗneia	Ρήνεια	Ríneia	ˈrinia	Rhenea
Ῥῆνος	Rhênos	Ρήνος	Rínos	ˈrinos	Rhenus; Rhine
Ῥίον	Rhíon	Ρίο	Río	ˈrio	Rhium
Ῥοδανός	Rhodanós	Ροδανός	Rodanós	roðaˈnos	Rhodanus; Rhône
Ῥοδόπη	Rhodópē	Ροδόπη	Rodópi	roˈðopi	Rhodope
Ῥόδος	Rhódos	Ρόδος	Ródos	ˈroðos	Rhodes
Ῥουβίκων	Rhoubíkōn	Ῥουβίκων	Rouvíkon	ruˈvikon	Rubicon
Ῥουμανία	Rhoumanía	Ρουμανία	Roumanía	rumaˈnia	Romania
Ῥῶ	Rhô	Ρω	Ro	ro	Rho
Ῥωμανία	Rhōmanía	Ρωμανία	Romanía	romaˈnia	Rhomania; Byzantine Empire
Ῥώμη	Rhṓmē	Ρώμη	Rómi	ˈromi	Rome; Roma
Ῥωμυλία	Rhōmylía	Ρωμυλία	Romylía	romiˈlia	Rumelia
Ῥωσσία	Rhōssía	Ρωσία	Rosía	roˈsia	Russia; Rossija

=== Σ ===
Classical/Katharevousa		Modern Greek			English
Greek alphabet	Transliteration	Greek alphabet	Transliteration	IPA	English
Σάϊς	Sáïs	Σάις	Sáis	ˈsais	Sais
Σαλαμινία	Salaminía	Σαλαμινία	Salaminía	salamiˈnia	Salaminia
Σαλαμίς	Salamís	Σαλαμίνα	Salamína	salaˈmina	Salamis
Σαμάρεια	Samáreia	Σαμάρεια	Samáreia	saˈmaria	Samaria
Σαμοθρᾴκη	Samothrāíkē	Σαμοθράκη	Samothráki	samoˈθraci	Samothrace
Σάμος	Sámos	Σάμος	Sámos	ˈsamos	Samos
Σαμψοῦς	Sampsoûs	Σαμψούντα	Sampsoúnta	sampˈsuda	Sampsus; Samsun
Σαντορίνη	Santorínē	Σαντορίνη	Santoríni	sadoˈrini	Santorini
Σάνη	Sánē	Σάνη	Sáni	ˈsani	Sane
Σάρδεις	Sárdeis	Σάρδεις	Sárdeis	ˈsarðis	Sardis; Sart
Σαρδώ	Sardṓ	Σαρδηνία	Sardinía	sarðiˈnia	Sardinia
Σαρωνικὸς Κόλπος	Sarōnikòs Kólpos	Σαρωνικός Κόλπος	Saronikós Kólpos	saroniˈkos ˈkolpos	Saronic Gulf
Σεβάστεια	Sebásteia	Σεβάστεια	Sevásteia	seˈvastia	Sebasteia; Sivas
Σεβαστούπολις	Sebastoúpolis	Σεβαστούπολη	Sevastoúpoli	sevasˈtupoli	Sebastopol
Σελεύκεια	Seleúkeia	Σελεύκεια	Seléfkeia	seˈlefcia	Seleucia
Σελήνη	Selḗnē	Σελήνη	Selíni	seˈlini	Moon
Σελινοῦς	Selinoûs	Σελινούντα	Selinoúnta	seliˈnuda	Selinus; Selinunte
Σελλασία	Sellasía	Σελλασία	Sellasía	selaˈsia	Sellasia
Σερβία	Serbía	Σερβία	Servía	serˈvia	Serbia; Srbija
Σέριφος	Sériphos	Σέριφος	Sérifos	ˈserifos	Seriphos
Σέῤῥαι	Sérrhai	Σέρρες	Sérres	ˈseres	Serrhae; Serres
Σηκοάνας	Sēkoánas	Σηκοάνας	Sikoánas	sikoˈanas	Sequana; Seine
Σηλυμβρία	Sēlymbría	Σηλυμβρία	Silymvría	silimˈvria	Selymbria; Silivri
Σῆστος	Sêstos	Σήστος	Sístos	ˈsistos	Sestos
Σίγειον	Sígeion	Σίγειο	Sígeio	ˈsiʝio	Sigeum
Σιδών	Sidṓn	Σιδών	Sidón	siˈðon	Sidon
Σιθωνία	Sithōnía	Σιθωνία	Sithonía	siθoˈnia	Sithonia
Σικᾶγον	Sikâgon	Σικάγο	Sikágo	siˈkaɣo	Chicago
Σικανία	Sikanía	Σικανία	Sikanía	sikaˈnia	Sicania
Σικελία	Sikelía	Σικελία	Sikelía	siceˈlia	Sicily
Σίκινος	Síkinos	Σίκινος	Síkinos	ˈsicinos	Sikinos
Σικυών	Sikyṓn	Σικυών	Sikyón	siciˈon	Sicyon
Σιμόεις	Simóeis	Σιμόεντα	Simóenta	siˈmoeda	Simoeis
Σίνθος	Sínthos	Σίνθος	Sínthos	ˈsinθos	Sindh
Σινώπη	Sinṓpē	Σινώπη	Sinópi	siˈnopi	Sinope; Sinop
Σίπυλος	Sípylos	Σίπυλος	Sípylos	ˈsipilos	Sipylus
Σῖφαι	Sîphai	Σίφαι	Sífai	ˈsife	Siphae
Σίφνος	Síphnos	Σίφνος	Sífnos	ˈsifnos	Siphnus
Σκάμανδρος	Skámandros	Σκάμανδρος	Skámandros	ˈskamanðros	Scamander; Karamenderes
Σκίαθος	Skíathos	Σκιάθος	Skiáthos	ˈscaθos	Sciathus
Σκότουσα	Skótousa	Σκότουσα	Skótousa	ˈskotusa	Scotussa
Σκοῦποι	Skoûpoi	Σκόπια	Skópia	ˈskopça	Scupi; Üsküp; Skopje
Σκυθική	Skythikḗ	Σκυθία	Skythía	sciˈθia	Scythia
Σκύρος	Skýros	Σκύρος	Skýros	ˈsciros	Scyrus
Σμύρνη	Smýrnē	Σμύρνη	Smýrni	ˈzmirni	Smyrna; İzmir
Σόλοι	Sóloi	Σόλοι	Sóloi	ˈsoli	Soli
Σούνιον	Soúnion	Σούνιο	Soúnio	ˈsunio	Sunium
Σοῦσα	Soûsa	Σούσα	Soúsa	ˈsusa	Susa
Σοφία	Sophía	Σόφια	Sófia	ˈsofça	Sofia
Σπάρτη	Spártē	Σπάρτη	Spárti	ˈsparti	Sparta
Σπερχαιός	Sperkhaiós	Σπερχαιός	Sperchaiós	sperçeˈos	Spercheus
Σποράδες	Sporádes	Σποράδες	Sporádes	spoˈraðes	Sporades
Στάγειρος	Stágeiros	Στάγειρα	Stágeira	ˈstaʝira	Stageira
Στρατονίκεια	Stratoníkeia	Στρατονίκεια	Stratoníkeia	stratoˈnicia	Stratonicea
Στρογγυλή	Strongylḗ	Στρογγυλή	Strongylí	stroɲʝiˈli	Strongyli; Strongili; Stromboli
Στρυμών	Strymṓn	Στρυμόνας	Strymónas	striˈmonas	Strymon; Struma
Στύξ	Stýks	Στυξ	Styx	stiks	Styx
Σύβαρις	Sýbaris	Σύβαρη	Sývari	ˈsivari	Sybaris; Sibari
Σύβοτα	Sýbota	Σύβοτα	Sývota	ˈsivota	Syvota
Σύμη	Sýmē	Σύμη	Sými	ˈsimi	Syme
Συμπληγάδες	Symplēgádes	Συμπληγάδες	Sympligádes	sibliˈɣaðes	Symplegades
Συρακοῦσαι	Syrakoûsai	Συρακούσα	Syrakoúsa	siraˈkusa	Siracuse
Συρία	Syría	Συρία	Syría	siˈria	Syria
Σύρος	Sýros	Σύρος	Sýros	ˈsiros	Syros
Σφακτηρία	Sphaktēría	Σφακτηρία	Sfaktiría	sfaktiˈria	Sphacteria (Sphagia)

=== Τ ===
Classical/Katharevousa		Modern Greek			English
Greek alphabet	Transliteration	Greek alphabet	Transliteration	IPA	English
Ταίναρος	Taínaros	Ταίναρος	Taínaros	ˈtenaros	Taenarus
Τάναγρα	Tánagra	Τανάγρα	Tanágra	taˈnaɣra	Tanagra
Τάναϊς	Tánaïs	Τανάιδα	Tanáida	taˈnaiða	Tanais; Don
Τάρας	Táras	Τάραντας	Tárantas	ˈtaradas	Taras; Tarentum; Taranto
Ταρκύνιοι	Tarkýnioi	Ταρκύνιοι	Tarkýnioi	tarˈcinii	Tarquinii; Tarquinia
Ταρσός	Tarsós	Ταρσός	Tarsós	tarˈsos	Tarsus
Τάρταρος	Tártaros	Τάρταρος	Tártaros	ˈtartaros	Tartarus
Τάρτησσος	Tártēssos	Τάρτησσος	Tártissos	ˈtartisos	Tartessus
Ταΰγετος	Taǘgetos	Ταΰγετος	Taýgetos	taˈiʝetos	Taygetus
Ταυρίς	Taurís	Ταυρίδα	Tavrída	taˈvriða	Tauris; Taurica; Crimea
Ταυρομένιον	Tauroménion	Ταυρομένιο	Tavroménio	tavroˈmenio	Tauromenium; Taormina
Ταῦρος	Taûros	Ταύρος	Távros	ˈtavros	Taurus; Toros
Τεγέα	Tegéa	Τεγέα	Tegéa	teˈʝea	Tegea
Τελμησσός	Telmēssós	Τελμησσός	Telmissós	telmiˈsos	Telmessus
Τέλενδος	Télendos	Τέλενδος	Télendos	ˈtelenðos	Telendos
Τέμπη	Témpē	Τέμπη	Témpi	ˈtebi	Tempe
Τενέα	Tenéa	Τενέα	Tenéa	teˈnea	Tenea
Τένεδος	Ténedos	Τένεδος	Ténedos	ˈteneðos	Tenedos; Bozcaada
Τέρμερα	Térmera	Τέρμερα	Térmera	ˈtermera	Termera; Assarlik
Τευκρίς	Teukrís	Τευκρίδα	Tefkrída	tefˈkriða	Teucris
Τέως	Téōs	Τέως	Téos	ˈteos	Teos; Sığacık
Τῆλος	Têlos	Τήλος	Tílos	ˈtilos	Telos
Τῆνος	Tênos	Τήνος	Tínos	ˈtinos	Tenos
Τιβεριάς	Tiberiás	Τιβεριάδα	Tiveriáda	tiveriˈaða	Tiberias; Teverya
Τίβερις	Tíberis	Τίβερης	Tíveris	ˈtiveris	Tiber; Tevere
Τιγρανόκερτα	Tigranókerta	Τιγρανόκερτα	Tigranókerta	tiɣraˈnocerta	Tigranakert
Τίγρης	Tígrēs	Τίγρης	Tígris	ˈtiɣris	Tigris
Τίρυνς	Tíruns	Τίρυνθα	Tíryntha	ˈtirinθa	Tiryns
Τιτάν	Titán	Τιτάνας	Titánas	tiˈtanas	Titan
Τιφλίς	Tiphlís	Τιφλίδα	Tiflída	tiˈfliða	Tiflis; Tbilisi
Τμῶλος	Tmôlos	Τμώλος	Tmólos	ˈtmolos	Tmolus
Τορόντο	Torónto	Τορόντο	Torónto	toˈronto	Toronto
Τουρκία	Tourkía	Τουρκία	Tourkía	turˈcia	Turkey
Τραϊανούπολις	Traïanoúpolis	Τραϊανούπολη	Traïanoúpoli	traʝaˈnupoli	Trajanopolis
Τράλλεις	Trálleis	Τράλλεις	Trálleis	ˈtral(l)is	Tralles; Aydın
Τραπεζοῦς	Trapezoûs	Τραπεζούντα	Trapezoúnta	trapeˈzuda	Trapezus; Trebizond; Trabzon
Τρεβίας	Trebías	Τρεβίας	Trevías	treˈvias	Trebbia
Τρινακρία	Trinakría	Τρινακρία	Trinakría	trinaˈkria	Trinacria; Sicily
Τρίπολις	Trípolis	Τρίπολη	Trípoli	ˈtripoli	Tripoli
Τρίτων	Trítōn	Τρίτωνας	Trítonas	ˈtritonas	Triton
Τριφυλία	Triphylía	Τριφυλία	Trifylía	trifiˈlia	Triphylia
Τροία	Troía	Τροία	Troía	ˈtria	Troy; Truva
Τροιζήν	Troizḗn	Τροιζήνα	Troizína	triˈzina	Troezen
Τοῦσκλον	Toûsklon	Τούσκλο	Toúsklo	ˈtusklo	Tusculum
Τρωάς	Trōás	Τρωάδα	Troáda	troˈaða	Troad
Τύρος	Týros	Τύρος	Týros	ˈtiros	Tyre; Sur
Τυῤῥηνία	Tyrrhēnía	Τυρσηνία	Tyrsinía	tirsiˈnia	Tyrrhenia; Etruria

=== Υ ===
Classical/Katharevousa		Modern Greek			English
Greek alphabet	Transliteration	Greek alphabet	Transliteration	IPA	English
Ὕαλος	Hýalos	Γυαλί	Gyalí	ʝaˈli	Gyali
Ὕβλα	Hýbla	Ύβλα	Ývla	ˈivla	Hybla
Ὑδάσπης	Hydáspēs	Υδάσπης	Ydáspis	iˈðaspis	Hydaspes; Jhelum
Ὑδράμα	Hydráma	Δράμα	Dráma	ˈðrama	Hydrama; Drama
Ὑδρέα	Hydréa	Ύδρα	Ýdra	ˈiðra	Hydrea; Hydra
Ὕκκαρα	Hýkkara	Ύκκαρα	Ýkkara	ˈikara	Hyccara
Ὑσιαί	Hysiaí	Υσιές	Ysiés	isiˈes	Hysiae

=== Φ ===
Classical/Katharevousa		Modern Greek			English
Greek alphabet	Transliteration	Greek alphabet	Transliteration	IPA	English
Φαιακία	Phaiakía	Φαιακία	Faiakía	feaˈcia	Phaeacia; Scheria
Φαλερίοι	Phaleríoi	Φαλερίοι	Faleríoi	faleˈrii	Falerii
Φάληρον	Phálēron	Φάληρο	Fáliro	ˈfaliro	Phalerum
Φαρμακονήσιον	Pharmakonḗsion	Φαρμακονήσι	Farmakonísi	farmakoˈnisi	Pharmakonisi
Φάρος	Pháros	Φάρος	Fáros	ˈfaros	Pharos
Φάρσαλος	Phársala	Φάρσαλα	Fársala	ˈfarsala	Pharsalus
Φασηλίς	Phasēlίs	Φασηλίδα	Fasilída	fasiˈliða	Phaselis
Φάσις	Phásis	Φάσις	Fásis	ˈfasis	Phasis; Rioni
Φεραί	Pheraί	Φερές	Ferés	feˈres	Pherae
Φθία	Phthίa	Φθία	Fthίa	ˈfθia	Phthia
Φθιῶτις	Phthiôtis	Φθιώτιδα	Fthiótida	fθioˈtiða	Phthiotis
Φιδήνη	Phidḗnē	Φιδήνη	Fidíni	fiˈðini	Fidenae
Φιλαδέλφεια	Philadélpheia	Φιλαδέλφεια	Filadélfeia	filaˈðelfia	Philadelphia
Φίλαι	Phílai	Φίλες	Fíles	ˈfiles	Philae
Φιλιππῖναι	Philippînai	Φιλιππίνες	Filippínes	filipˈines	Philippines
Φιλιππούπολις	Philippoúpolis	Φιλιππούπολη	Filippoúpoli	filipˈupoli	Philippopolis; Plovdiv
Φλεγέθων	Phlegéthōn	Φλεγέθων	Flegéthon	fleˈʝeθon	Phlegethon
Φλέγρα	Phlégra	Φλέγρα	Flégra	ˈfleɣra	Phlegra
Φλιοῦς	Phlioûs	Φλιοῦντα	Flioúnta	fliˈuda	Phlius
Φλώρινα	Phlṓrina	Φλώρινα	Flórina	ˈflorina	Florina
Φοινίκη	Phoiníkē	Φοινίκη	Foiníki	fiˈnici	Phoenicia; Canaan
Φολέγανδρος	Pholégandros	Φολέγανδρος	Folégandros	foˈleɣanðros	Pholegandros
Φολόη	Pholóē	Φολόη	Folói	foˈloi	Pholoe
Φοῦρνοι Κορσέων	Phoûrnoi Korséōn	Φούρνοι Κορσέων	Foúrnoi Korséon	ˈfurni korˈseon	Fourni Korseon
Φρανκφούρτη	Phran'kphoúrtē	Φρανκφούρτη	Frankfoúrti	fraŋkˈfurti	Frankfurt
Φρέγελλα	Phrégella	Φρέγελλα	Frégella	freˈʝel(l)a	Fregellae
Φρυγία	Phrygía	Φρυγία	Frygía	friˈʝia	Phrygia
Φύσκος	Phýskos	Φύσκος	Fýskos	ˈfiskos	Physcus; Marmaris; Tornadotus
Φώκαια	Phṓkaia	Φώκαια	Fókaia	ˈfocea	Phocaea; Foça
Φωκίς	Phōkís	Φωκίδα	Fokída	foˈciða	Phocis

=== Χ ===
Classical/Katharevousa		Modern Greek			English
Greek alphabet	Transliteration	Greek alphabet	Transliteration	IPA	English
Χαιρώνεια	Khairṓneia	Χαιρώνεια	Chairóneia	çeˈronia	Chaeronea
Χάλκη	Khálkē	Χάλκη	Chálki	ˈxalci	Chalce
Χαλκηδών	Khalkēdṓn	Χαλκηδόνα	Chalkidóna	xalciˈðona	Chalcedon; Kadıköy
Χαλκιδική	Khalkidikḗ	Χαλκιδική	Chalkidikí	xalciðiˈci	Chalcidice
Χαλκίς	Khalkís	Χαλκίδα	Chalkída	xalˈciða	Chalcis
Χανιά	Khaniá	Χανιά	Chaniá	xaˈɲa	Chania
Χαονία	Khaonía	Χαονία	Chaonía	xaoˈnia	Chaonia
Χερσόνησος	Khersónēsos	Χερσόνησος	Khersónisos	çerˈsonisos	Chersonese
Χίος	Khíos	Χίος	Chíos	ˈçios	Chios
Χοάσπης	Khoáspēs	Χοάσπης	Choáspis	xoˈaspis	Choaspes
Χριστιανά	Khristianá	Χριστιανά	Christianá	xristçaˈna	Christiana
Χρύση	Khrýsē	Χρύση	Chrýsi	ˈxrisi	Chryse
Χρυσόπολις	Khrysópolis	Χρυσόπολη	Chrysópoli	xriˈsopoli	Chrysopolis

=== Ψ ===
Classical/Katharevousa		Modern Greek			English
Greek alphabet	Transliteration	Greek alphabet	Transliteration	IPA	English
Ψαρά	Psará	Ψαρά	Psará	psaˈra	Psara
Ψείρα	Pseíra	Ψείρα	Pseíra	ˈpsira	Pseira
Ψέριμος	Psérimos	Ψέριμος	Psérimos	ˈpserimos	Pserimos

=== Ω ===
Classical/Katharevousa		Modern Greek			English
Greek alphabet	Transliteration	Greek alphabet	Transliteration	IPA	English
Ὠκεανία	Ōkeanía	Ωκεανία	Okeanía	oceaˈnia	Oceania
Ὦξος	Ôksos	Ώξος	Óxos	ˈoksos	Oxus; Amu Darya
Ὠρεός	Ōreós	Ωρεός	Oreós	oreˈos	Oreus
Ὠρικόν	Ōrikón	Ωρικό	Orikó	oriˈko	Oricum
Ὠρωπός	Ōrōpós	Ωρωπός	Oropós	oroˈpos	Oropus
Ὠστία	Ōstía	Ωστία	Ostía	osˈtia	Ostia

== See also ==
- Geographical name changes in Greece
