= Panormos =

Panormos (Greek: Πάνορμος) or Panormus, meaning "sheltered harbor", may refer to:

== Places ==
=== Ancient places ===
- Panormus (Achaea), a town of ancient Achaea, Greece
- Panormus (Attica), a town of ancient Attica, Greece
- Panormus (Caria), a town of ancient Caria, now in Turkey
- Panormus (Cephalonia), a town of ancient Cephalonia, Greece
- Panhormus (Cilicia), a town of ancient Cilicia, now in Turkey
- Panormos (Crete), a town of ancient Crete, Greece
- Panormus (Epirus), a city of ancient Epirus, now in Albania
- Panormus (Halicarnassus), a town of ancient Caria on the Halicarnassus peninsula, now in Turkey
- Panormus (Ionia), a town of ancient Ionia, now in Turkey
- Panormus (Megaris), a town of ancient Megaris, Greece
- Panormus (Skopelos), a town of ancient Skopelos, Greece
- Panormus (Thrace), a town of ancient Thrace, now in Turkey
- Palermo in ancient Sicily, Italy, known in antiquity as Panormos/Panormus
- Bandırma in Turkey, founded as Panormos
- Pisilis, also known as Panormos, in Turkey
- Panormo, the highest peak of the Alburni mountain range, Campania, Italy
- Panormos bay in the northwest corner of the island of Astypalaia, Dodecanese, Greece
- Panorma bay (and Panorma beach) between Porto Palermo and Queparo, Himara district, Albania

=== Modern places ===
- Panormos, Tinos, a village and a community on the island of Tinos, Cyclades, Greece
- Panormos, Naxos, a gulf and natural harbor, Apeiranthos, Naxos, Cyclades, Greece
- Panormos, Kalymnos, a village on the island of Kalymnos, Dodecanese, Greece
- Panormos, a harbor on the island of Samos, Greece
- Panormos, Skopelos, a village on the island of Skopelos, Greece
- Panormos, Rethymno, a village in the Rethymno regional unit, Crete, Greece
- Panormos, Phocis, a village in Phocis, Greece

== Other uses ==
- Battle of Panormus (251 BC), at the site of present-day Palermo
- Siege of Panormus
- Greek torpedo boat Panormos, which served in the Greek navy from 1919–1928
