= Strongylo =

Strongylo (Greek: Στρογγυλό) may refer to several places in Greece:

- Strongylo, Arcadia, a village in Arcadia
- Strongylo (east Syros), a small island near the east coast of Syros in the Cyclades
- Strongylo (south Syros), a small island near the southwest coast of Syros in the Cyclades
- Strongylo (Fournoi), a small island near the south coast of Fournoi in the North Aegean
- Strongylo (Arkoi), a small island near the west coast of Arkoi in the Dodecanese

== See also ==
- Strongyli (disambiguation)
- Strongylos
