= Cynoscephalae =

Cynoscephalae (Ancient Greek: Κυνὸς κεφαλαί, meaning "dog's heads") may refer to:

== Geography ==
- Cynoscephalae (Boeotia), a town of ancient Boeotia
- Cynoscephalae (Thessaly), a town of ancient Thessaly
- Cynoscephalae Hills (Boeotia), a range of hills in ancient Boeotia
- Cynoscephalae Hills (Thessaly), a range of hills in ancient Thessaly (where the battles below were fought)

== History ==
- Battle of Cynoscephalae (197 BC), between Rome and Macedon
- Battle of Cynoscephalae (364 BC), between Thebes and Thessaly

== See also ==
- Battle of Cynossema (411 BC), between Sparta and Athens
