= Physcon =

Physcon (Ancient Greek: Φύσκων, "fat") may refer to:

- Ptolemy VIII Physcon, a king
- Tornadotus, a river
