= Stratonice =

Stratonice may refer to:

- Stratonice (mythology), one of several Greek mythological women

== People ==
- Stratonice, one of the names of the mother of Alexander the Great
- Stratonice (wife of Antigonus), the wife of Antigonus Monophthalmus
- Stratonice of Cappadocia, the wife of Ariarathes III of Cappadocia
- Stratonice of Libya, the wife of Archagathus of Libya
- Stratonice of Macedonia, the wife of Demetrius II of Macedon
- Stratonice of Pergamon, the wife of Eumenes II of Pergamum
- Stratonice of Pontus, one of the wives of Mithridates VI of Pontus
- Stratonice of Syria, the wife of Seleucus I Nicator and Antiochus I Soter

== Music ==
- Stratonice (opera), by Étienne Méhul

== See also ==
- Stratonicea (disambiguation), several cities named after these women
