= Paralus =

Paralus may refer to:

- Paralus (place), a former place in Egypt
- Paralus (ship), an Athenian trireme
- Paralus, a son of Pericles, see Paralus and Xanthippus
