= Physcus =

Physcus or Physkos (Ancient Greek: Φύσκος) may refer to:

- Marmaris, a port in Turkey
- Physca, a town of ancient Macedon, Greece
- Tornadotus, a river in Iraq
- Physcus (mythology)
