= Methone (Macedonia) =

City in Ancient Greece

- Μεθώνη (Ancient Greek)
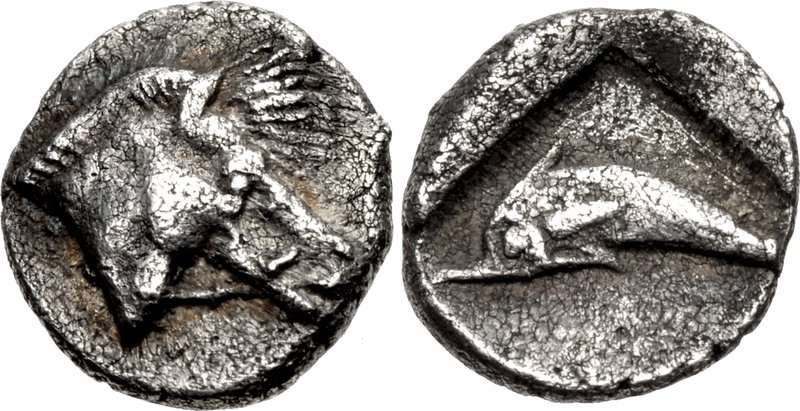
- Thracian Methonean coinage (5th century BC)
- Interactive map of Methone
- 40°28′03″N 22°35′01″E

Methone (Greek: Μεθώνη, Methṓnē), also called Thracian or Macedonian Methone to distinguish it from numerous other ancient Methones, was a city-state in Ancient Greece, near the city of Pydna and the modern village of Nea Agathoupolis in Pieria. According to Plutarch, Methone was founded as a Greek colony in the year 733/732 BC. Methone gained special importance by the finding of labeled pottery and potsherds. It is one of the oldest testimonies of Greek writing and an important place in the history of Pieria.

== Location ==
The ancient city of Methone was located on the northeastern shore of the Thermaic Gulf, in the northern Aegean in Greece. It was right on the sea, north of the modern town of Methoni. Due to the deposition of sediments, especially of the river Aliakmonas, the ancient village is now about 500 m distant from the coast. The archaeological remains of the city consist of buildings on the west and east hills and had a harbor. Around 700 BC the city had an area of about 20 hectares.

The ancient Eretrian settlement of Methone, located at the interface between the Thessaloniki plain, the hilly terrain of Pieria and the shoreline of Thermaic Gulf, has gone through numerous wartime situations over the past centuries. Methone has been well known as an important harbor during the Greek times closely affiliated with the Athenian Alliance. According to historical manuscripts the urban settlement was distanced from the harbor. However, there exist no historical references about either the distance or the potential locations of the harbor.

Identification of the precise location of the port of Methone holds great significance from a geomorphological point of view, but above all represents a major archaeological concern. The port infrastructures appear to have been disconnected from the rest of the city: Several decrees (notably in 430 and 423 BC) provide us with information on the matter (Queyrel, 2003). These infrastructures had been seized by the powerful city of Athens, in order to leave Methone a degree of commercial autonomy with regards to the Kingdom of Macedon which was in full development at the time. One of these decrees, dated 430 BC, mentions that "the Methoneans must enjoy unrestricted rights to use the sea and [the Macedonians] must allow them, as before, to import goods on their territory".

We also know that in 359 BC, Argeas, former enemy of Amyntas (father of Philip II of Macedon), or according to certain historians (Diodorus, XVI, 3, 5.) one of his sons, had just obtained a fleet of 3,000 hoplites from the Athenians: The troops disembarked and then set up in Methone. No more references to the city are to be found in the texts after the seizure, then destruction, of the city by Philip II's armies during the summer of 354 BC. There are signs of occupation during the Imperial period but there is no evidence of a continuous presence in the sector after the 4th century BC (Papazoglou, 1988).

Research efforts aiming to locate Methone were undertaken from the 19th century, first by the famous English explorer W.M. Leake (Leake, 1967) who had traveled Macedonia at length and then by Léon Heuzey (Heuzey, 1876), who thought he had found the port of former Methone, "marked by a small creek forming the shore not far from the mouths of Haliacmon" (Heuzey, 1876). Their respective research remained imprecise and no definite occupation site was ever identified. Their research was more focused on the quest for the royal tomb of Philip II and the necropolis of the Temenid and Macedonian kings: Aigai, identified in the 1980s with the site of modern Vergina.

In the middle of the 20th century, Hammond used the descriptions of Strabo (Strabon, VII, fragments 20 and 22), positioning the city of Methone at 70 stades (14 km) from Aloros (the original city of Ptolemy of Aloros) and at 40 stades (8 km) from Pydna (Pydna (Ancient Site)), to produce the hypothesis whereby Methone must have been located nearby the current eponymous city. Later, during the 1980s, two occupation sites were confirmed: The first, dating from the Archaic and Classical periods (Site A), was identified using archaeological material that had been found and then analyzed. The second site, located slightly further north, dates from the Imperial period (site B) and presents a smaller spatial extension than the first (Hatzopoulos et al., 1990); nevertheless, no hypotheses concerning the location of port infrastructures were formulated, or even suggested.

== Mythology ==
In ancient sources, the figure of Methone is mentioned as one of the daughters of Alkyoneus. She is also known as the sister of Pierios, the founder of Pieria. According to Plutarch, the city was named after its founder, Methon, an ancestor of Orpheus. Another interpretation refers to the production and excessive consumption of wine.

== History ==
=== Neolithic Age ===
The area around Methone was inhabited since the late Neolithic period (5000 BC to 3000 BC).

=== Late Bronze Age ===
From the late Bronze Age (1450 BC to 1100 BC), contacts of the inhabitants with the southern Aegean are documented.

=== Iron Age ===
During the early Iron Age (11th to 8th centuries BC) the city was expanded.

Methone was founded in the second half of the 8th century BC of Eretrian settlers, who were previously evicted by Corinthian colonists from the island Corfu. Originally the settlers wanted after the expulsion from Corfu return to their hometown of Eretria on Euboea, but the citizens of Eretria, having learned of their arrival in advance, refused to admit them and prevented them from landing by pelting them with stones from slings. Unable either to persuade the inhabitants or force a landing, the exiles sailed to Thrace, where they settled. Therefore, the Methonians were called by their neighbors οἱ ἀποσφενδόνητοι (driven away by sling-stones).

The city is considered the oldest Greek colony in the northern Aegean. Due to the favorable location, it became a hub of trade with the Balkans. Since the founding of the colony, there existed production facilities for various goods and a trading port. In addition to the settlers from Euboea, local residents, Phoenicians and merchants from the eastern Aegean participated in the trade. The ports of Methone and Pydna reached 600 BC to 500 BC importance, especially in the shipment of timber and tar (shipbuilding).

=== Classical Age ===
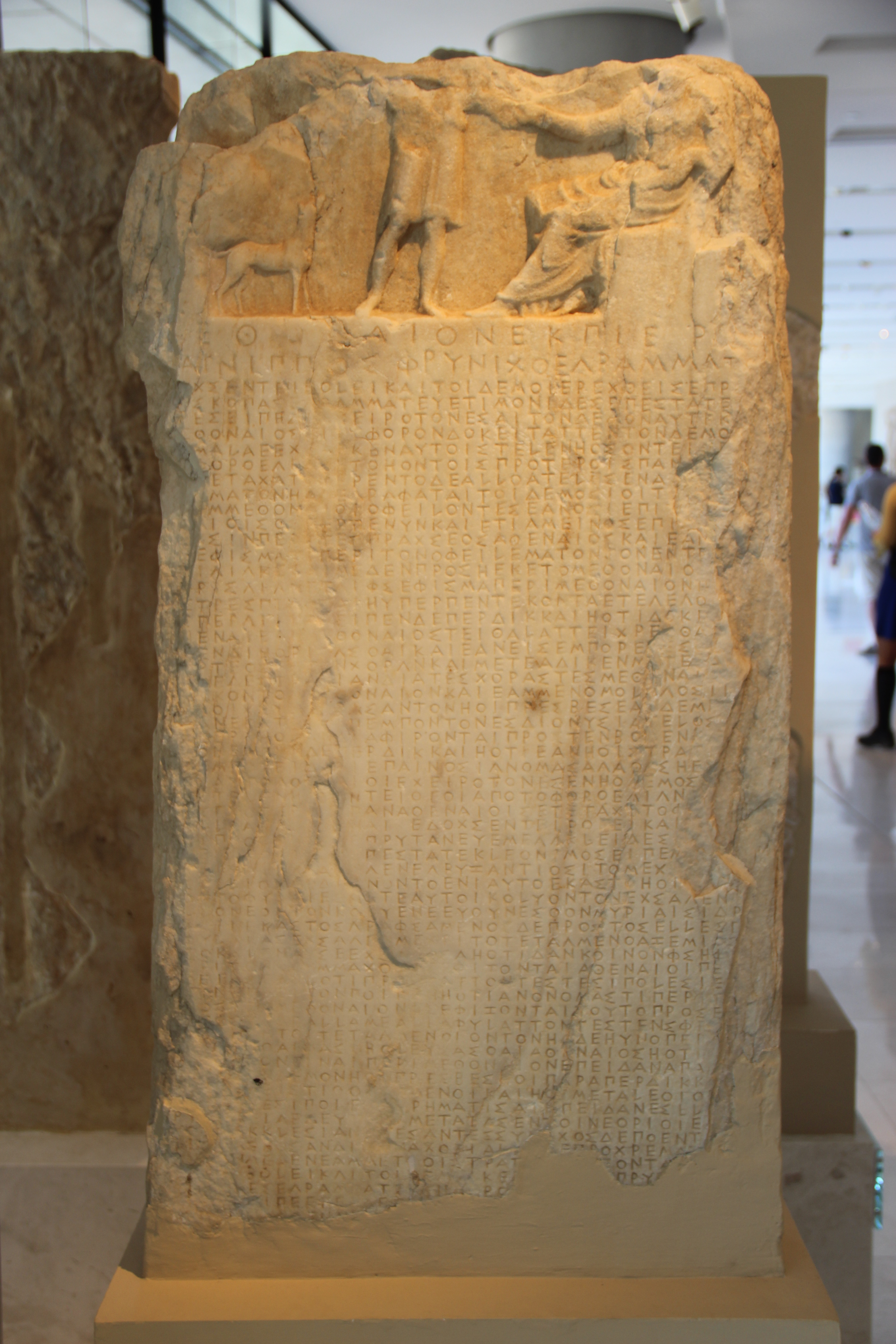
Athenian decrees for Methone, 430/29–424/3 BC (IG I^{3} 61)

Unlike the rest of Pieria, Methone was not ruled by Macedonia but was an ally of Athens and since 434 BC, a member of the Athenian League. The city was besieged by the Macedonian king Philip II, who thereby lost his eye by an arrow (354/3 BC). After their surrender King Philip allowed the inhabitants to leave the city. However, they were not allowed to take their belongings, only the clothes they wore were left to them. Methone was destroyed and has not been historically mentioned since.

It is probable that the apostle Paul resumed his second missionary mission to Athens from here, after leaving Berea (modern Veria) (Acts 17:14, 15).

== Archaeology ==
=== Excavation history ===
The location of Methone was established in 1972. In 2003, excavation work began on the eastern hill, in 2006 on the western hill. They were executed under the direction of the archaeologist Matthaios Besios of the 27th Ephorate of Prehistoric and Classical Antiquity.

One problem that hinders the excavations is that most of the land belonging to the ancient city is privately owned. It is farmed so that many artifacts, which date from the 4th and 5th centuries BC, were destroyed. To carry out further excavations, this land must be purchased by the state. The exact location of the port is unknown. The Thermean Gulf extended then, until the beginning of the Byzantine era, to Pella, the capital of the Macedonian Empire. Later began the silting through the rivers Axios and Aliakmonas.

One of the most important finds was the exposure of the agora and its surrounding buildings on the west side of the eastern hill. The finds from the excavations of Methone, especially in the Ypogeio, contributed significantly to the research on the genesis and distribution of the Greek alphabet and its early use.

From 2013 to 2017, a team from UCLA (University of California, Los Angeles), led by Dr. Sarah Morris and Dr. John Papadopoulos took part at the excavations.

The results were published in 2012, funded by the European Union in the Education and Lifelong Learning program. In 2013, a book in Greek and English language was published to inform the public.

=== Excavations ===
==== Eastern hill ====
In the Neolithic, the eastern hill was wider, it was washed away from the sea over time. After the owner of the property had agreed, parts of the city were exposed. The found building remains date from 550 BC to 400 BC. It is an approximately 100 by 80 meters measuring area in the approximately four meters deep was dug. There was a smaller Agora surrounded by public buildings. Parts of a second place were found, so that the assumption is that instead of a central agora several smaller existed.

===== Ypogeio =====
The Ypogeio (cellar, here meeting basement, Greek Υπόγειο) is a more than 11 meters deep pit on the crest of the eastern hill. At the bottom it measures 3.60 m by 4.20 m. Presumably it was a storage room, which was not completed because of the instability of the hill. Around 700 BC the pit was then filled with wooden beams, stone molds for metal working, slag and potsherds. The ceramic remains come from different types of vessels. In addition to cookware, large amphorae and dinnerware, the remains of drinking vessels were found. The pottery came from different places of origin. In addition to local products, more were found in Phoenicia, Attica, Euboea, Cyclades and Ionia. The nature and period of manufacture confirm Plutarch's claim that Methone was founded around 733 BC. The rich finds indicate that Macedonia was not seen as a peripheral area of the Greek world.

Among the artifacts were 191 remnants of clay pots that were painted and / or bore markings or characters. Among them are 25 vessels that have been labeled with symbols and are partially provided with writings.They are among the oldest known texts written in the Greek alphabet and provide evidence for its adoption and development from the Phoenician alphabet. The inscriptions consist of engravings or brushstrokes and were usually applied before firing the ceramic. According to archaeologists, the various types of inscriptions, carefully or rather carelessly, indicate that the writing was not only the privilege of professional writers but also popular among the population. In addition to the name of the owner, phrases or small poems were also written on the ceramics. Most of the texts are written from right to left (sinistrograde), but some are written from left to right (dextrograde) or alternate the direction of writing with each line (boustrophedon).

==== Western hill ====
This hill is slightly higher than the one to the east. The land on which was excavated belongs to the local school. Originally on the summit, since the late Bronze Age, the necropolis of the city was located. Around 900 BC the construction of buildings upon the necropolis began. This was done without taking care of the graves; the stone foundations of some houses even cut up the skeletons. The buildings themselves were built with bricks. The settlement was protected by a city wall. In order to improve their defense against enemies, a ditch was created outside the wall to actually increase the height of the wall. So far, three tunnels have been discovered that allowed the residents to leave the city. Presumably, in times of a siege, they served to create supplies to the city. Furthermore, kilns and remains of other crafts were found.

The army camp of Philip II was located about 500 meters south of the city.

== Bibliography ==
- Robert Malcolm Errington, "Methone, Stadt in der makedonischen Pieria", Der Neue Pauly (in German), vol. VIII, pp. 98–99
- Ernle Bradford, Die Reisen des Paulus Seite 201 (in German)
- Yannis Z. Tzifopoulos, ed. (2013), Letters from the 'Underground'. Writing in Methone, Pieria, late 8th - early 7th century BC, ISBN 978-960-9621-12-0
- Matthaios Bessios, Yannis Tzifopoulos and Antonis Kotsonas, Methone I: Inscriptions, Graffiti and Trademarks on Geometric and Archaic Pottery from the 'Ypogeio ( Thessaloniki: Centre for the Greek Language 2012)
