= Choaspes =

Choaspes may be referring to:

- Choaspes River (Iran), modern Karkheh River
- Choaspes River (Afghanistan)
- Choaspes (butterfly), a skipper butterfly genus
