= Moeris =

Moeris may refer to:

- Moeris (skipper), a genus of butterflies in the grass skipper family
- "Moeris, Dancing", 1978 instrumental by Art Bears from their album Hopes and Fears
- Lake Moeris, an ancient lake of Egypt
  - Amenemhat III (c. 1860–1814 BC), Twelfth Dynasty pharaoh who reportedly dug the lake
- Lacus Moeris, a surface feature on Mars
- Aelius Moeris (fl. 2nd century), Greek grammarian
