= Panormus (Thrace) =

Ancient Greek harbour

Panormus or Panormos (Ancient Greek: Πάνορμος) was a harbour at the extremity of the Thracian Chersonesus, in ancient Thrace opposite to the promontory of Sigeum (Cape Kumkale).
