= Strymon =

Strymon may refer to:

- Strymon (river), a river in Bulgaria and Greece
- Strymonian Gulf, a branch of the Thracian Sea
- Strymon (theme), a Byzantine province
- Strymon (butterfly), the genus of scrub hairstreaks, butterflies in the family Lycaenidae
- Strymon (mythology), a god in Greek mythology
- Strymon (company), a California-based brand of music electronics; specialized in guitar effects pedals

== See also ==
- Strymonas, a former municipality in Greece
