= Panhormus (Cilicia) =

Settlement and station (mutatio) of ancient Cilicia

Coordinates: 37°14′24″N 34°48′37″E

Panhormus, also known as Pylae or Pylai, was a settlement and station (mutatio) of ancient Cilicia, near the Cilician Gates (Greek: Kilikia Pylai) on the road between Tyana and Tarsus, inhabited during Roman Byzantine times.

Its site is tentatively located near Han in Asiatic Turkey.
