= Uzunada =

Island in Turkey

Coordinates: 38°30′16″N 26°42′53″E

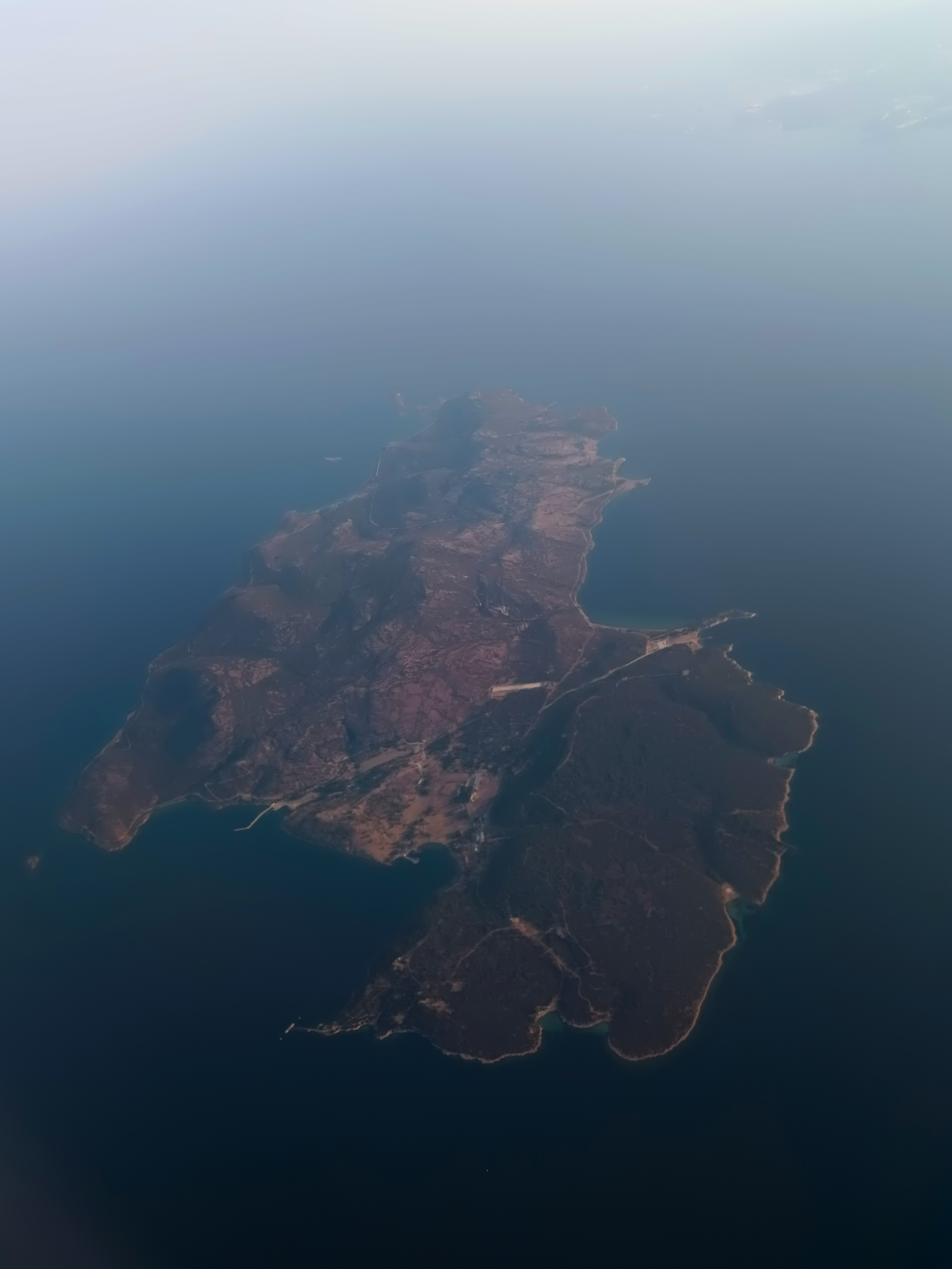
Uzunada, 2024

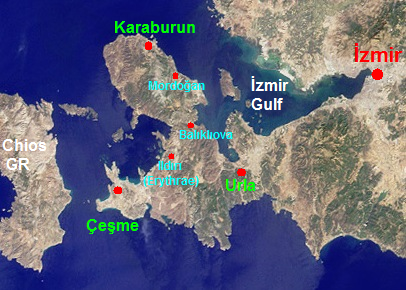
Map of Karaburun Peninsula at the western end of Turkey. Uzunada is the island located left of the notation İzmir Gulf

Uzunada or Uzun ada (lit. 'long island') is an island situated at the entry of the Gulf of İzmir on the west coast of Turkey. Its area is 26.8 km^{2} (10 sq mi).

It is situated between the Karaburun Peninsula, Turkey in the west, and the district of Foça in the east. Stretching over a length of c. 9 kilometres (6 miles) in north-south direction, it is Turkey's fourth largest island, and its third largest in the Aegean Sea.

The island has been called by many names. Its ancient Greek name was Drymoussa (Δρυμούσσα), and it is also known under its later Greek names of Makronisi ("long island") or Englezonisi ("Englishmen's island"), but more likely is that this name is derived from the word Enclazomenisi from ancient city Clazomenae at the opposite coast. To its south are several smaller islets, including Yassıca. It has also been called "Chustan Island" (or Keustan).

"Uzunada" is also the name of several other, smaller islets along the Turkish Aegean coast. Uzunada is currently closed to settlements due to military activities, making it the biggest uninhabited island in the Mediterranean Sea

== History ==
Thucydides briefly mentions Drymoussa as a location where some ships of the Spartan Navarch Astyochus put in for eight days during a period of high winds in the 20th year of the Peloponnesian War.

After the Treaty of Apamea was concluded in 188 B.C., the city of Clazomenae was awarded the island.

Despite claims of ownership of an English family dating from the mid-19th century, by 1914 there were about 2,000 Ottoman Greeks living on the island.

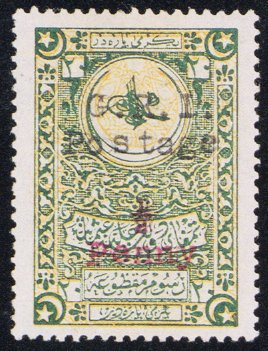
Stamp issued for the British Occupation of Uzunada, Ottoman Empire, 1916

During World War I, the British Mediterranean Fleet occupied the island (referred to as "Chustan") in 1916, where they also issued some rare stamps.

After the population exchange between Greece and Turkey, most of the island's former inhabitants settled in Nea Ionia, Magnesia.
