= Panormus (Megaris) =

Coordinates: 38°06′58″N 23°13′09″E

Panormus or Panormos (Ancient Greek: Πάνορμος) was a harbour on the coast of ancient Megaris.

Its site is located near the modern Psatha.
