= Methone =

Methone (Greek: Μεθώνη) may refer to:

- Methone (butterfly), a monotypic genus of metalmark butterflies
- Methone (moon), a small moon of Saturn, discovered in 2004
- Methone (mythology), the name of several figures from Greek mythology
- Dimedone, an organic molecule

== Geography ==
- Methana, also known as Methone, a town in ancient Argolis or modern Attica, Greece
- Methone (Messenia), a town in ancient Messenia, Greece
  - Methoni, Messenia, the modern town nearby
- Methone (Thessaly), a town in ancient Thessaly, Greece
- Methone (Thrace), a town in ancient Thrace, Greece
  - Methoni, Pieria, the modern town nearby

== See also ==
- Meton of Athens, an ancient Greek astronomer.
- Metonic cycle, a 19 year cycle of lunar event
