= Cynoscephalae Hills (Boeotia) =

Cynoscephalae (Ancient Greek: Κυνὸς κεφαλαί) was the name of a range of hills in ancient Boeotia between Thebes and Thespiae. Near them, or on them, was a village of the same name, which is mentioned by the biographers of Pindar as the birthplace of the poet.
