= Cynoscephalae (Boeotia) =

Cynoscephalae (Ancient Greek: Κυνὸς κεφαλαί) was a village of ancient Boeotia in the Cynoscephalae Hills. It was noted as the birthplace of Pindar.
