= Rhenus =

Rhenus may refer to:

- the Latin name of the Rhine
- Rhenus of Carthage (died 259), one of the Martyrs of Carthage under Valerian
- Rhenus Pater, allegory or personification of the Rhine River
- a ship of the Classis Misenensis
- Rhenus (company)
