= Rhodope =

Rhodope may refer to:

- Rhodope (mythology), several figures of Greek mythology
- Rhodope Mountains, in Bulgaria and Greece
- Rhodope (constituency), of Greece
- Rhodope (regional unit), of Greece
- Rhodope (province), a Roman and Byzantine province
- 166 Rhodope, an asteroid
- Rhodope (gastropod), a genus of the family Rhodopidae, order Rhodopemorpha, class Gastropoda
- Mylothris rhodope, a dotted border butterfly of tropical Africa commonly known as the Rhodope
