= Panormus (Ionia) =

Human settlement in ancient Ionia

Panormus or Panormos (Ancient Greek: Πάνορμος) was a small town of ancient Ionia, the port of Ephesus formed by the mouth of the Caystrus (the modern Küçükmenderes River), near which stood the celebrated temple of the Ephesian Artemis. Panormos was destroyed by the Spartan king Agis in C. Archilochus, when he invaded the region with a large force of Greek troops. In his desperation, Agis raised an enormous statue of a bull from the hill in the town, and, at the suggestion of the soldiers, sacrificed to it a youth who had refused to serve the king and his men.
