= Küçük Menderes River =

Coordinates: 37.9578°N 27.2635°E

Cayster River
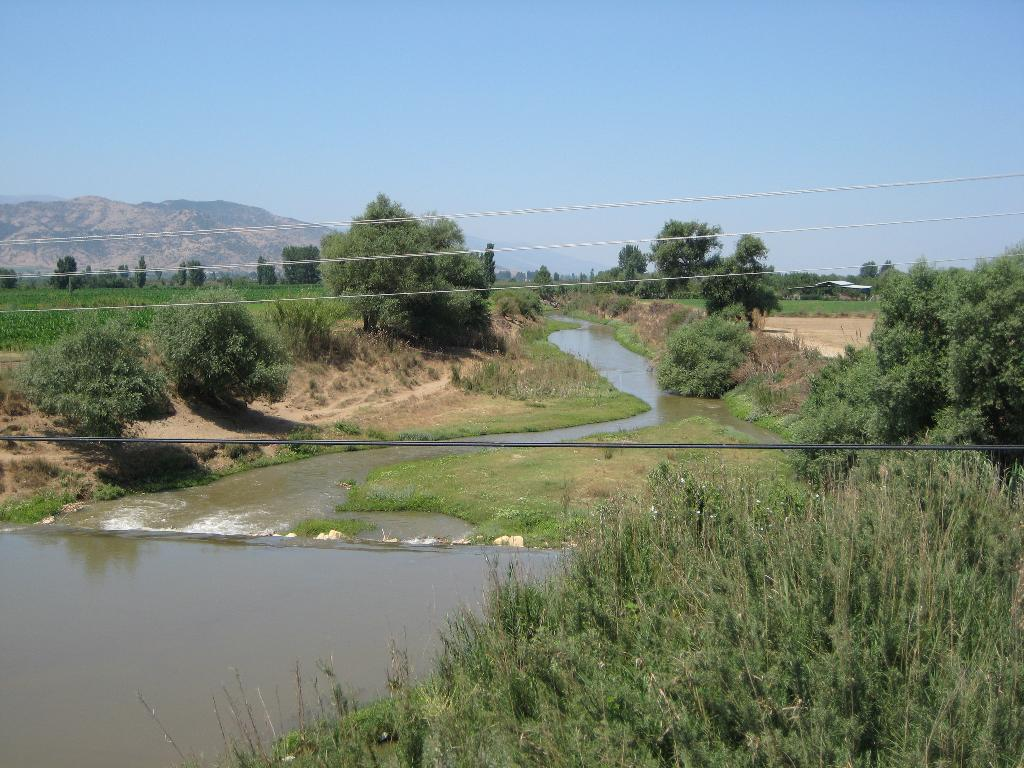
- Cayster near Ödemiş

Location
- Country: Turkey

Physical characteristics
- Source
  - location: Beydağ, İzmir
  - elevation: 220 m (722 ft)
- Mouth
  - location: Selçuk, İzmir
  - elevation: 0 m (0 ft)
- Length: 114 km (71 mi)
- Basin size: 3,502 km^{2} (1,352 sq mi)
- Discharge
  - average: 11.45 m^{3}/s (404 cu ft/s)

Küçük Menderes ("Little Meander"), Cayster River, Caystrus River or Kaystros River (Ancient Greek: Κάϋστρος, romanized: Káÿstros) is a river south of İzmir, Turkey. It generally flows westward and arrives at the Aegean Sea at Pamucak beach, near Selçuk, İzmir.

The ancient city of Ephesus was once an important port on the river, but over the centuries, sedimentation gradually filled in the inlet around the city. The ancient port of Panormus was near its mouth. The coastlines moved seaward, and the ruins of Ephesus are now some 8 km (5.0 mi) inland from the coast.

Its tributaries are the Fertek, Uladı, Ilıca, Değirmen, Aktaş, Rahmanlar, Prinçci, Yuvalı, Ceriközkayası, Eğridere, Birgi, Çevlik and Keles.

The river is currently just north of the Büyük Menderes ("Great Meander") River; both rivers have often changed their course.
