= Odessos =

Odessos (Ancient Greek: Ὀδησσός) or Odessus (Latin) may refer to:

- An ancient Greek colony, now Varna, Bulgaria
- An ancient Greek colony, now Koshary, Odesa Raion, Odesa Oblast, Ukraine
- Odesa, Ukraine, named for the second Greek colony
