= Panormus (Skopelos) =

Coordinates: 39°06′43″N 23°39′55″E

Panormus or Panormos (Ancient Greek: Πάνορμος) was an ancient harbour on the coast of the island of Skopelos in the Northern Sporades. It is mentioned by Diodorus and by Polyaenus; they relate that, around 361/0 BCE, Alexander of Pherae besieged Peparethus and occupied Panormus. Leosthenes, the Athenian admiral, commanded the troops that came to the aid of Peparethus, but Alexander resisted the siege in Panormus, seized some Athenians triremes by a stratagem and plundered Piraeus.

Its site is located near the modern village of Panormos, Skopelos.
