= Asine (disambiguation) =

Asine may refer to:

- Asine, an ancient Greek city in Argolis
- Asine (Messenia), an ancient Greek city in Messenia
- Asine (Laconia), an ancient Greek city in Laconia
- Asini, a village in Argolis, Greece
- Theodorus of Asine, an ancient Greek philosopher
- Asine; Crusader name for Asira ash-Shamaliya
