= Panormus (Halicarnassus) =

Ancient town of Turkey

Coordinates: 37°07′00″N 27°16′00″E

Panormus or Panormos (Ancient Greek: Πάνορμος) was a small port town of ancient Caria, on the peninsula of Halicarnassus, 80 stadia to the northeast of Myndus. It is no doubt the same port which Thucydides calls Πάνορμος τῆς Μιλησίας.

Its site is located near the modern Paşa Liman.
