= Heraea =

Heraea or Heraia can refer to:

- Heraea, an obsolete name of the genus Saturnia
- Heraea (Arcadia), an ancient Greek city in the Peloponnese
- Heraean Games, an ancient Greek athletic festival
- Hybla Heraea, an ancient city in Sicily
