= Paralus (Egypt) =

Paralus was a historical settlement located at one of the seven mouths of the Nile, Egypt known as Paralus or Sebennys. During Byzantine times it was located in the province of Ægyptus Secunda. The place, mentioned in the Notitia Episcopatuum, has been abandoned and is now covered with the waters of Lake Burullus.

The city was mentioned by Heroditus

Bishops of Paralas The town was the seat of an ancient bishopric. Several are known to us:

- Athanasius, assisted at the Council of Ephesus, in 431
- Pasmeius was present at the Robber Council of Ephesus, 449, and at the Council of Chalcedon,
- Un-named Jacobite Bishop
- Un-named Jacobite Bishop

The bishopric of Paralus is today included in the Catholic Church's list titular sees.
