= Strongyli =

Stroggyli or Strongyli (Greek: Στρογγυλή) may refer to the following places in Greece:

- Strongyle, a former name of the island of Santorini
- Strongyli Megistis, a small island near Kastellorizo
- Strongyli, a small island with a lighthouse in the Lichades in northwestern Evvia
- Stroggyli, a small island north of Nisyros in the Dodecanese
- Strongyli (Crete), a small island near the southeast coast of Crete
