= Stratonicea =

Stratonicea, Stratoniceia or Stratonikeia (Greek: Στρατoνίκεια), also found as Stratonice, Stratoniki, Stratonike (Greek: Στρατονίκη), can refer to any of several Hellenistic cities, including:

- Stratonicea (Caria), formerly Idrias and Chrysaoris, and later Hadrianopolis, east-southeast of Mylasa, now at Eskihisar, Muğla Province, Turkey
- Stratonicea (Lydia), now in Manisa Province, Turkey
- Stratonicea (Chalcidice), on the Akte Peninsula, Chalcidice, Greece
