= Tornadotus =

River in Iraq

Tornadotus (Greek: Τορναδότη) or Tornadatus or Physcon is a small river of Assyria (now in Iraq) that falls into the Tigris at Opis.

Pliny the Elder uses the name Tornadotus, but it is probably the same stream as that noticed by Xenophon under the name of the Physcus or Physcon. Writing in the early 9th century, Theophanes the Confessor calls the river the Torna in his Chronicle. Authors in the 19th century identified it with the modern Odorneh.
