= Panagia Kontariotissa =

7th-11th century Byzantine former church in Pieria, Central Macedonia, Greece

- Holy Church of the Dormition of the Virgin Mary
- Παναγία Κονταριώτισσα
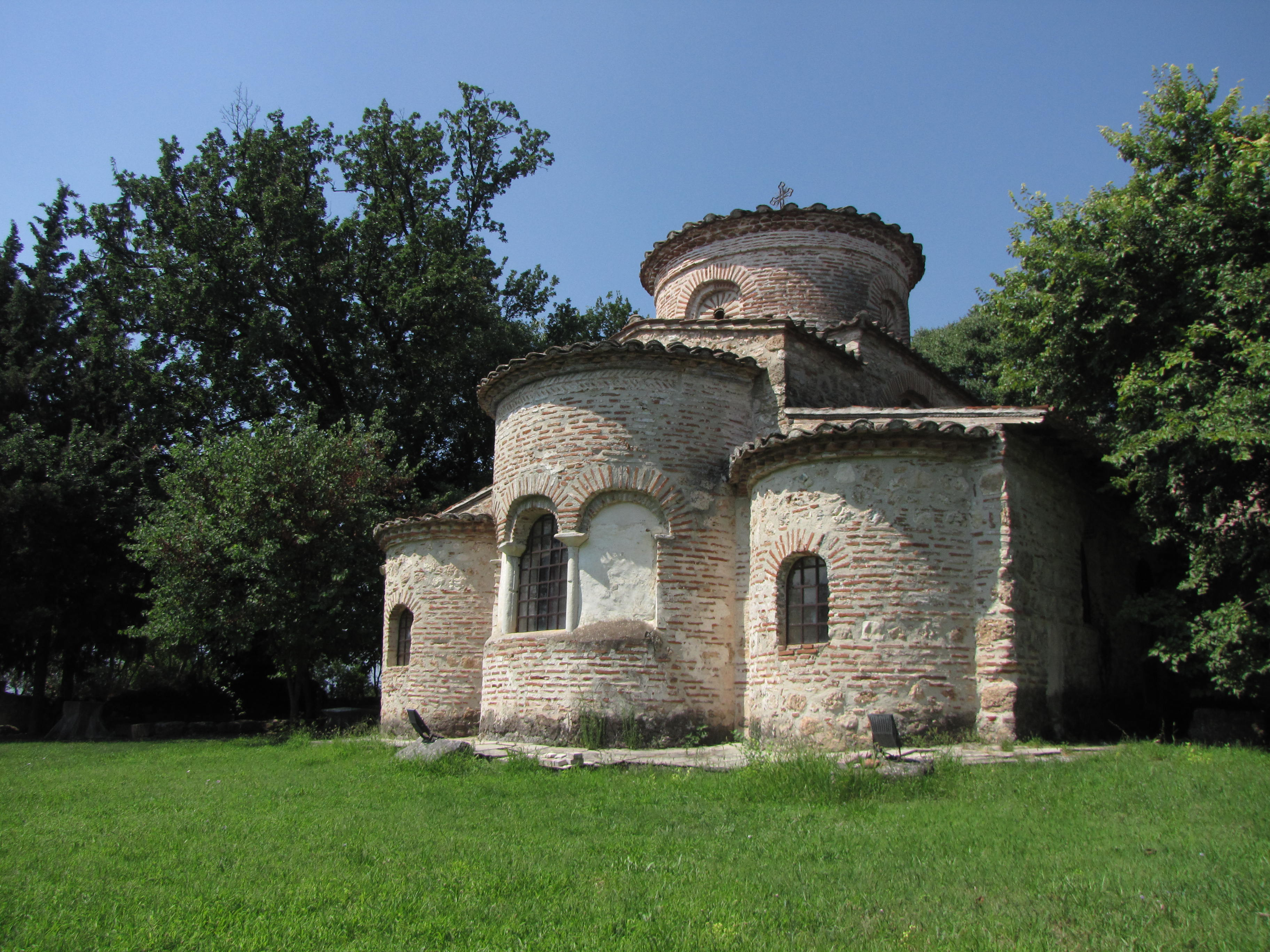
- The former church

- Location of the former church in Greece
- Panagia Kontariotissa
- 40°13′47″N 22°27′12″E
- Location: Pieria, Central Macedonia
- Country: Greece
- Denomination: Greek Orthodox (former)

History
- Status: Church (former); Cultural center
- Dedication: Dormition of the Virgin Mary
- Events: August 15

Architecture
- Functional status: Inactive (as a church); Repurposed (as a cultural center)
- Style: Byzantine
- Completed: c. 7th – c. 11th centuries

Specifications
- Materials: Stone

Administration
- Province: Ecumenical Patriarchate of Constantinople
- Metropolis: Kitros, Katerini and Platamon

The Panagia Kontariotissa (Greek: Παναγία Κονταριώτισσα), also spelled as the Panagia Kountouriotissa (Παναγία Κουντουριώτισσα), and officially the Holy Church of the Dormition of the Virgin Mary (Ιερός Ναός Κοιμήσεως της Θεοτόκου), is a former Greek Orthodox church, located in the Pieria region of Central Macedonia, Greece. Completed in the c. 7th – c. 11th centuries, during the Byzantine era, the well-preserved monument has subsequently been repurposed for cultural use. The monument is located on a hill on the northwestern outskirts of the village Kontariotissa, approximately 6.5 kilometres (4.0 mi) southwest of Katerini on the slopes of Mount Olympus. Nearby is the Monastery of Saint Ephraim the Syrian.

The name "Kontariotissa" refers to the name of the modern community that originated near the former church.

== Use as a church ==
Judging by the morphology of the building, it was built at the time of the Byzantine Iconoclasm or earlier. The construction is dated from the 7th century, structural changes took place in the 11th century and in the 15th century the building was restored. Parts of the exterior wall show various styles of stonework. The construction of the church is said to be related to the simultaneous destruction and abandonment of ancient Dion.

The building has a cylindrical dome supported by four round pillars and has a chapel in the north and south. The apse, delimited by a carved wooden iconostasis, in the eastern part of the church, is bounded by a three-part window. Apse, dome and parts of the walls are decorated with murals. Nothing is left of the original decor, the visible frescoes date back to the 15th century. Some of the terracotta floor tiles are labeled "Dion". The early parts of the structure are similar to the basilica of Agia Sophia in Thessaloniki. Similar features were found in other Greek churches of the 8th and 9th centuries. Possibly the church was used as a monastery church (katholikon).

== Gallery ==
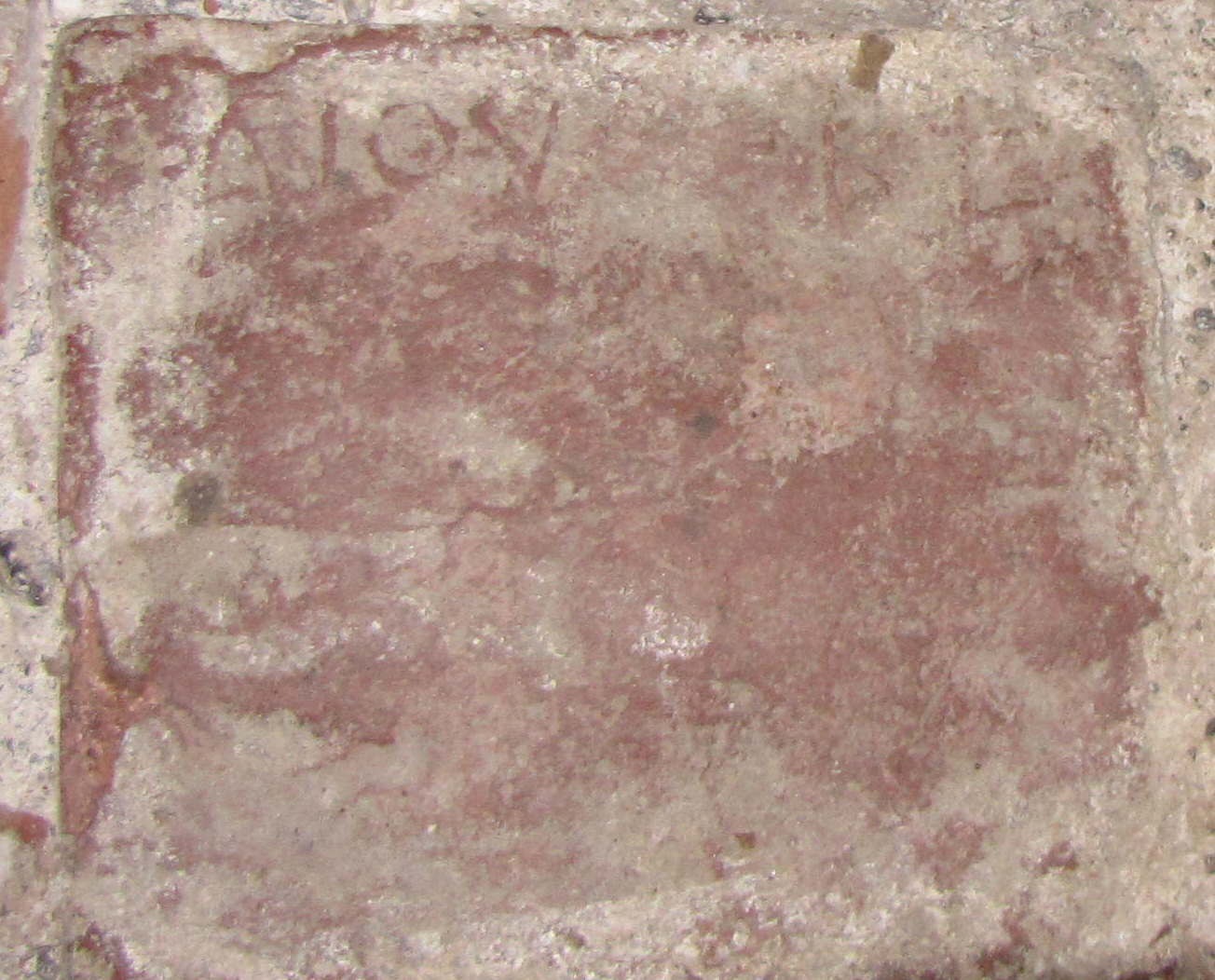
Terracotta tile with inscription "Dion"

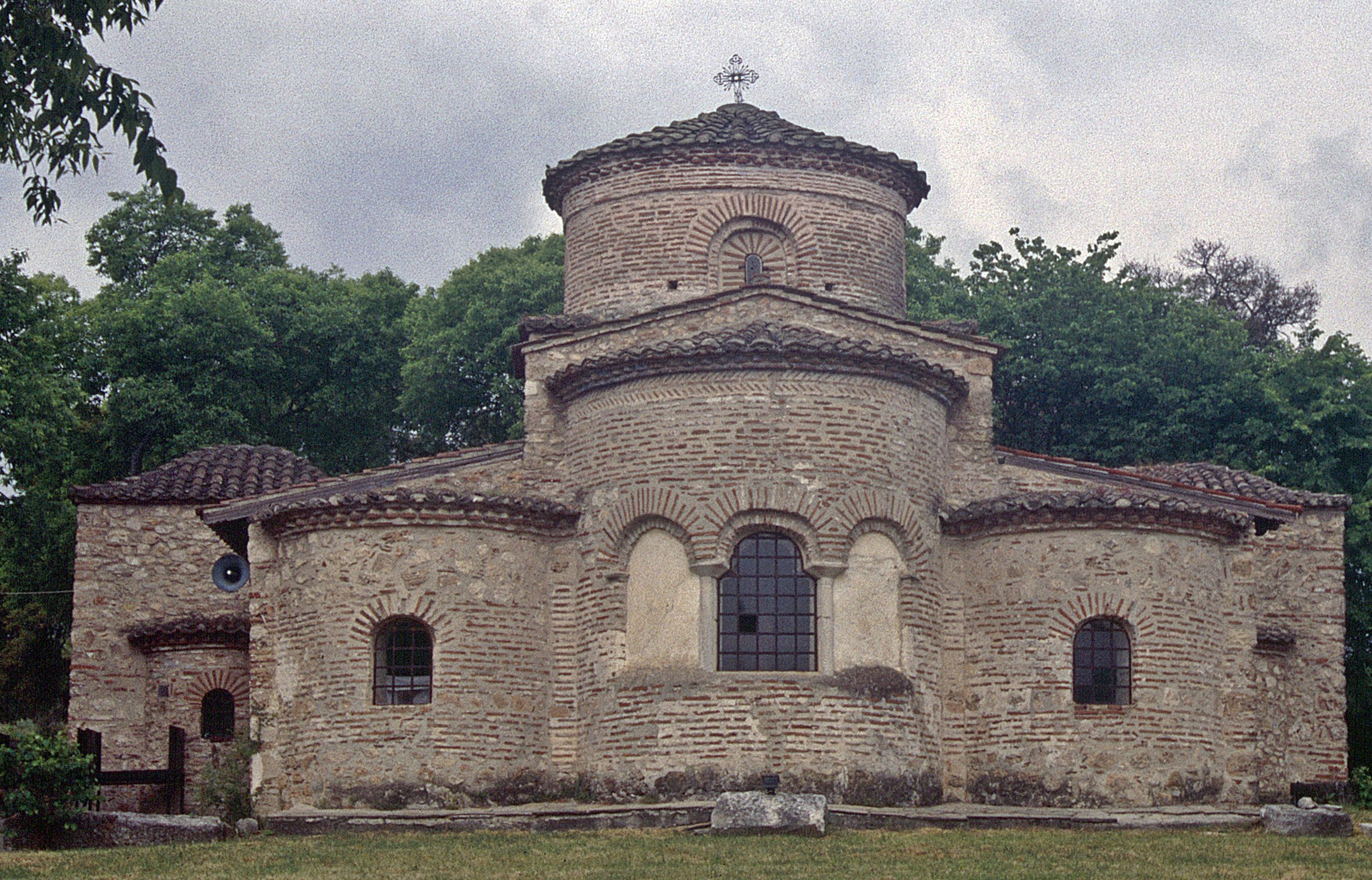
Close view

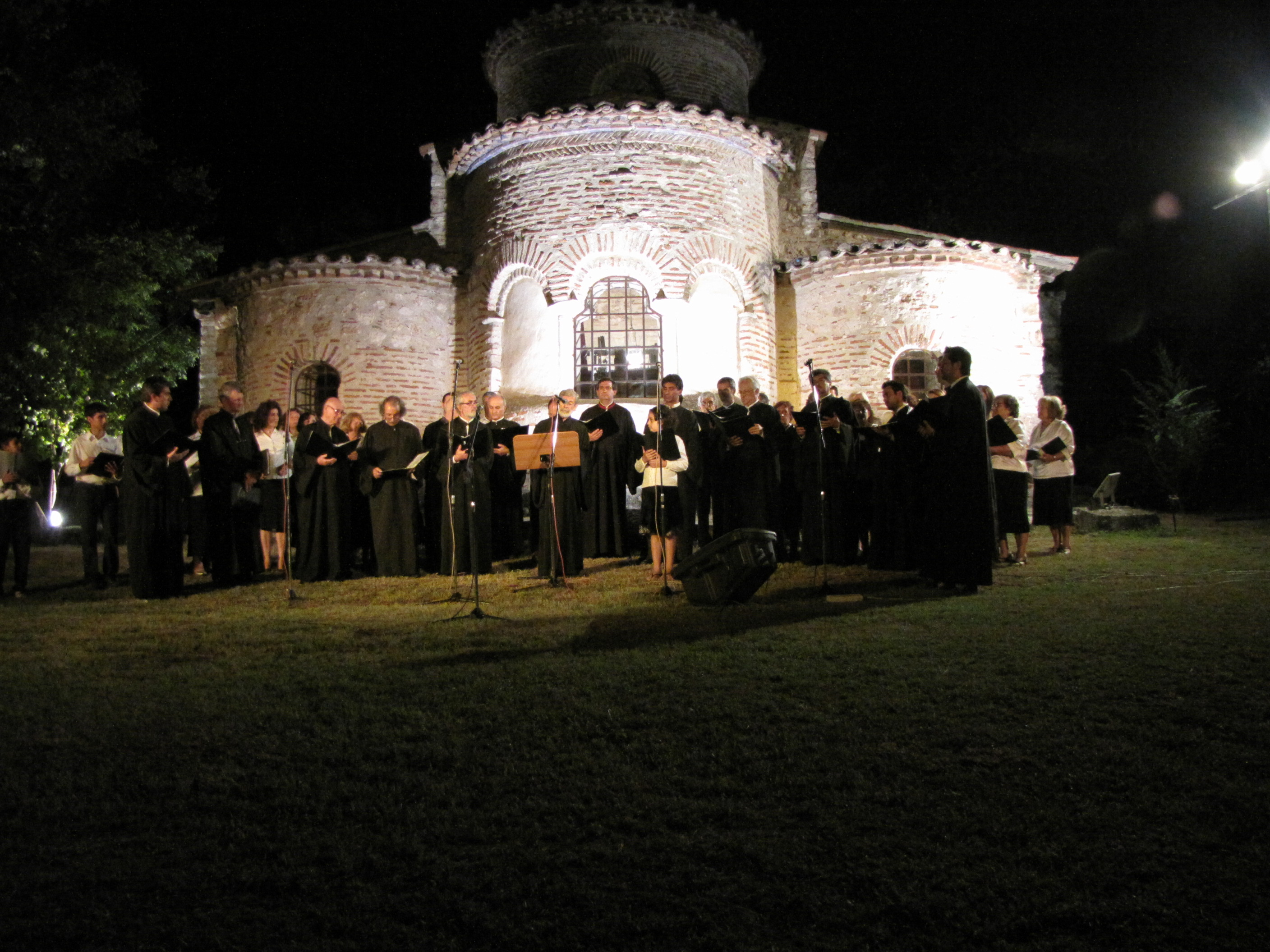
Choir at the former church during the Olympus Festival

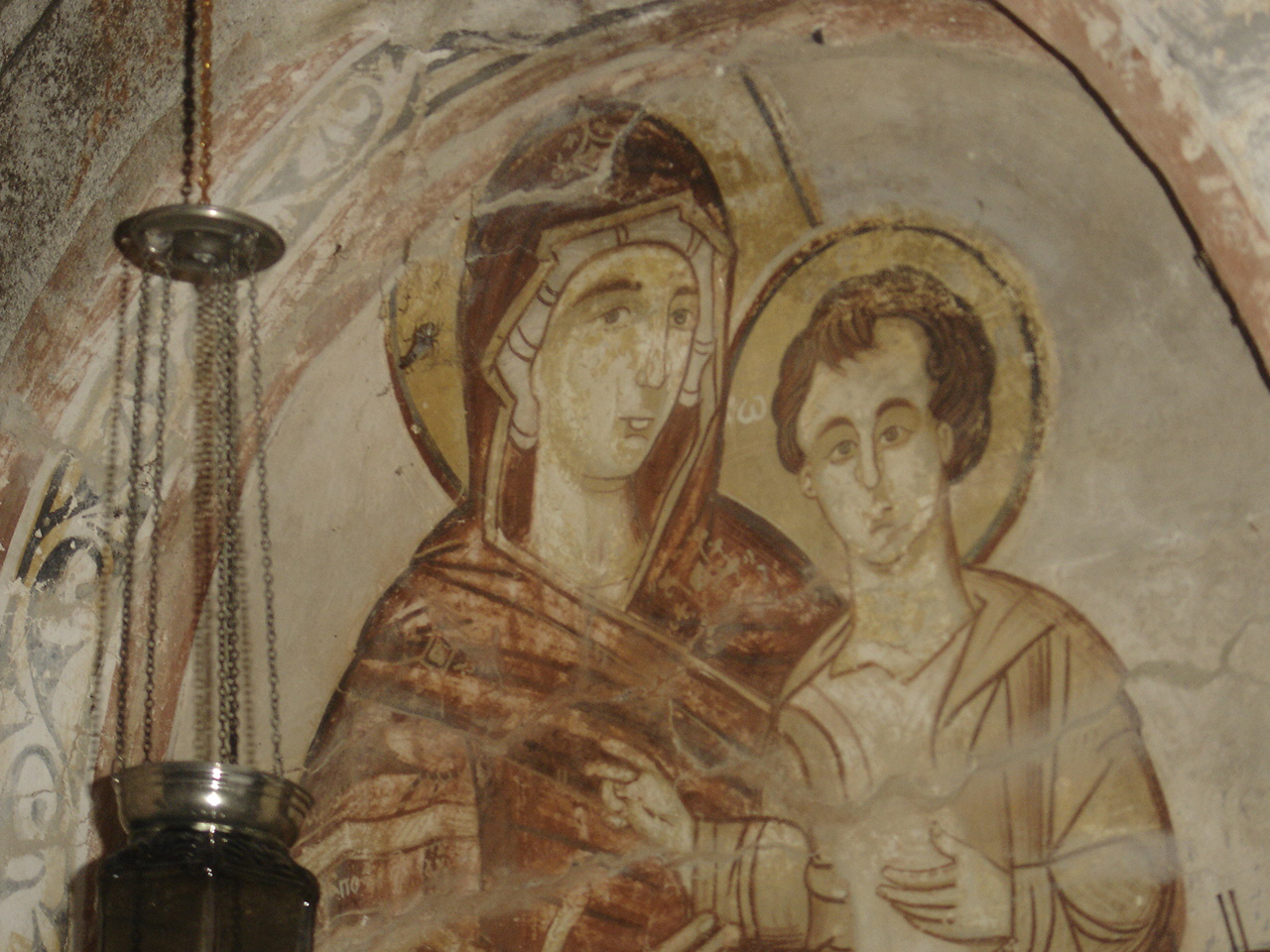
Mural inside the former church

== See also ==
- Church of Greece
- List of Eastern Orthodox church buildings in Greece
- List of monasteries and churches at Mount Olympus
