= List of monasteries and churches at Mount Olympus =

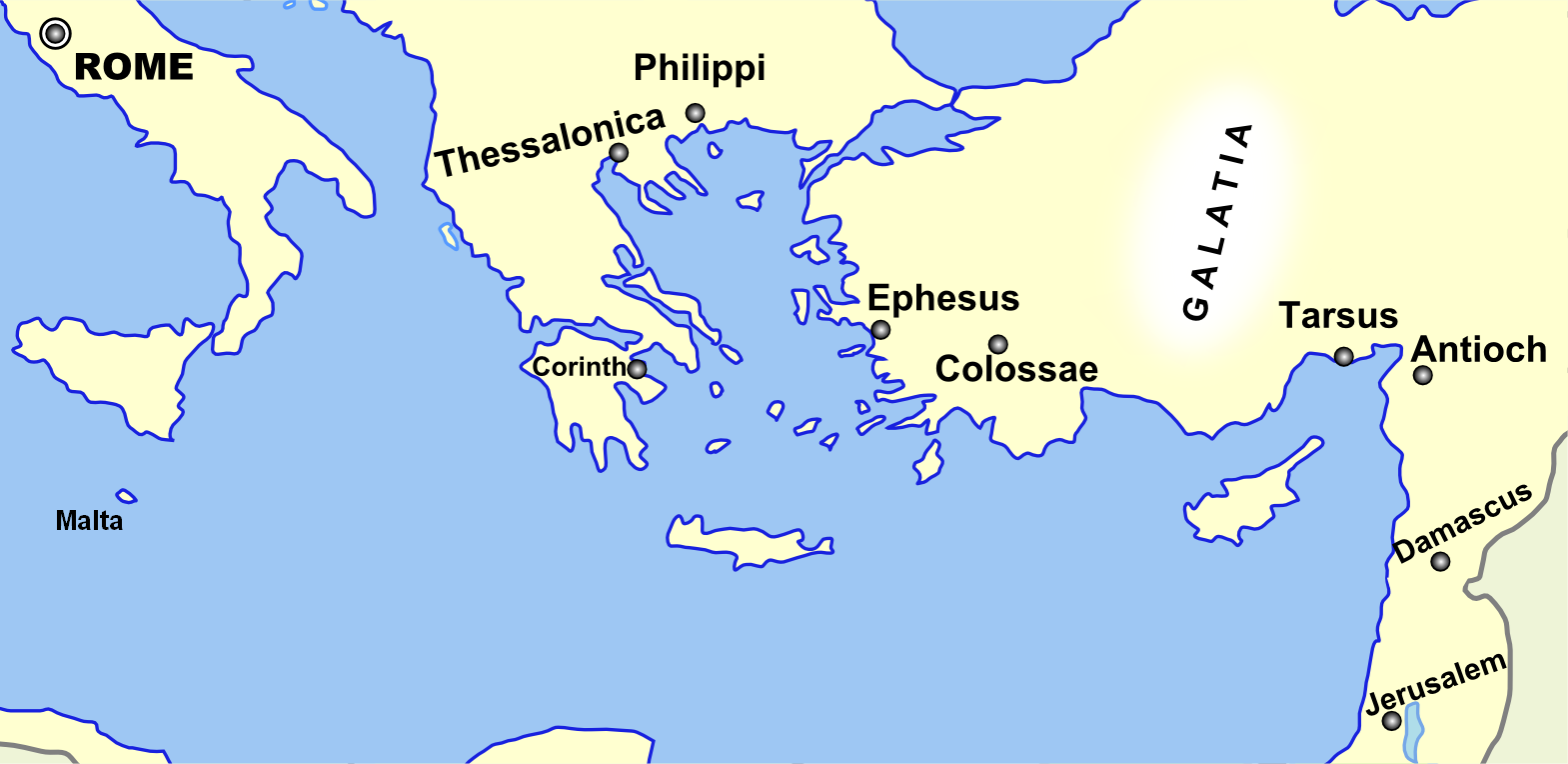
Stations of the journey of Paul of Tarsus (Apostle Paul)

The Christianization of the Olympus region began relatively early. While the episcopal seats from Byzantine times only remaining ruins, inhabited and used monasteries and churches are still present at this time at Olympus. Some of the monasteries are a stauropegion, ie they are directly subordinate to the Patriarch of Constantinople, others belong to a diocese. The number of churches and chapels around Mount Olympus is hard to overlook. That is why only the monasteries and most important churches are mentioned.

== History ==
On his journey from Jerusalem to Corinth, in the first half of the 1st century, the apostle Paul also visited the northern Greek city of Thessaloniki. His 1st Letter to the Thessalonians is one of the oldest writings of Christendom. Paul founded Christian communities, among others in Macedonia and Greece. In the 4th century Dion became the first bishopric of the region.

== Byzantine ecclesiastical buildings ==
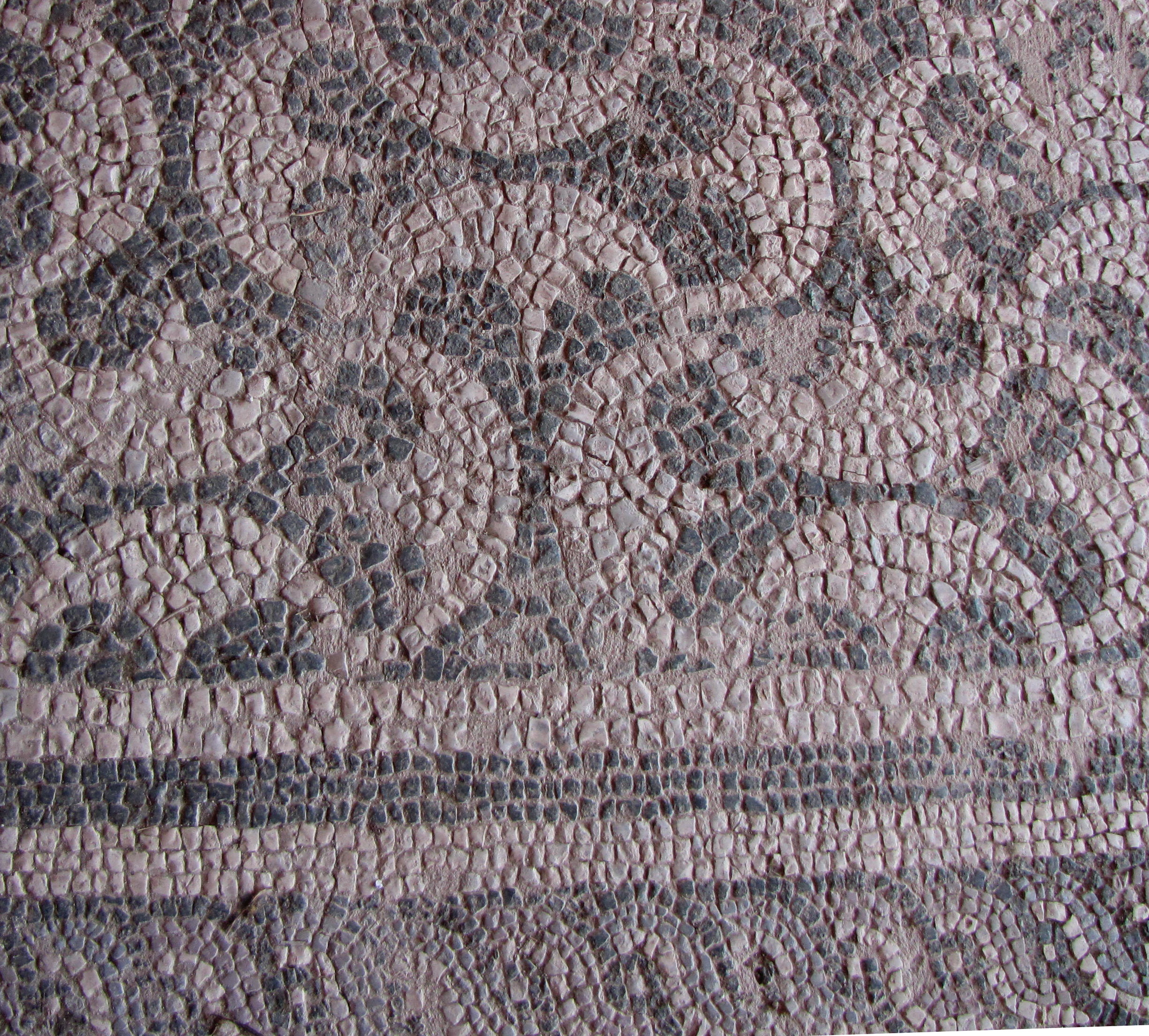
Part of a mosaic, Louloudies

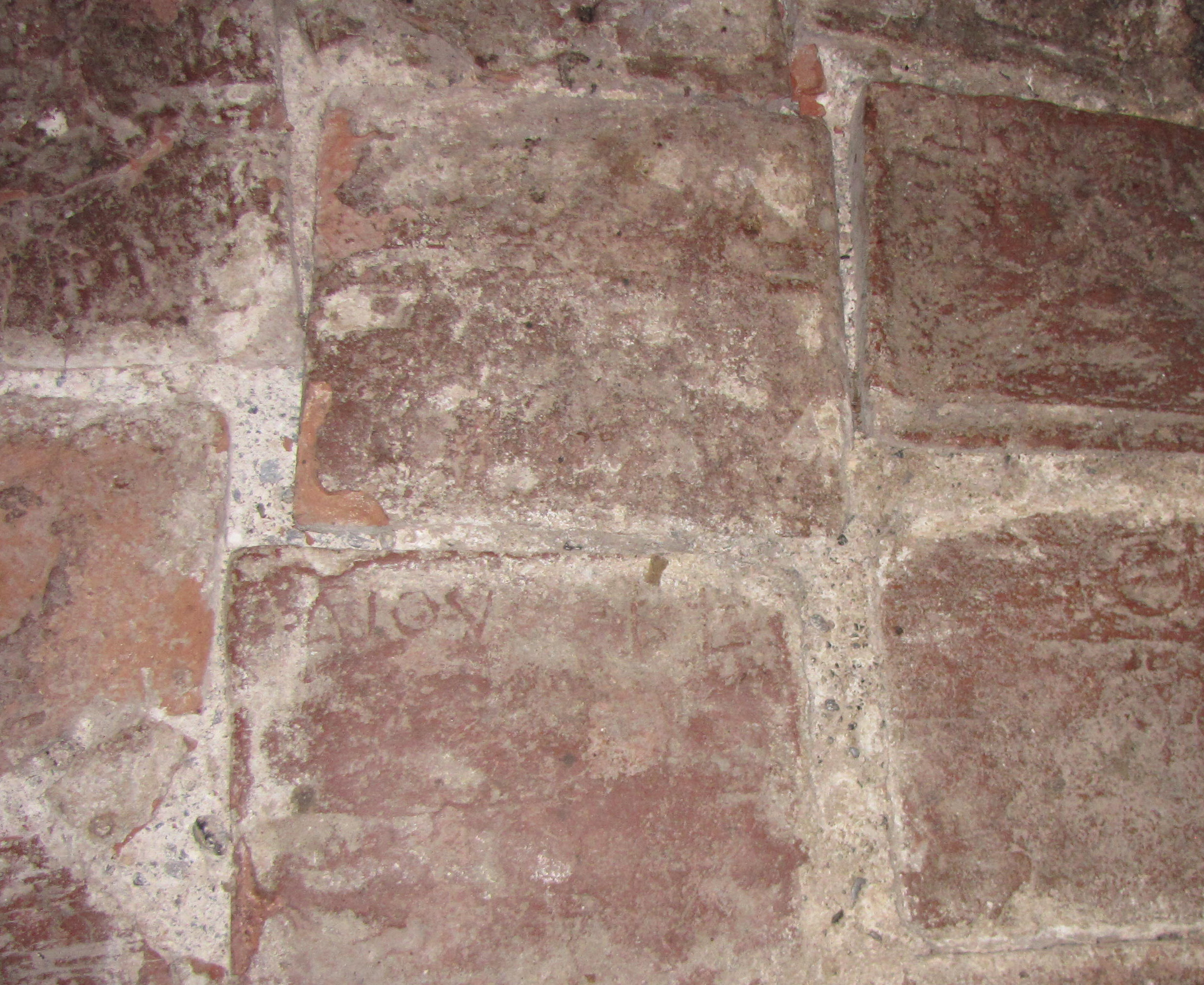
Terracottatile of the church Panagia, Kontariotissa, with the inscription "Dion"

=== Dion ===
The basilica of the bishop was built in two phases. It was started in the 4th century. After being destroyed by an earthquake, it was completed in the 5th century. It was a three-nave church with narthex. A smaller building, west of the church, served as a baptistery.

=== Louloudies ===
This fortress-like episcopal seat was built in the last quarter of the 5th century. It is probably the same place that was called Anamon in Roman records. In the middle of the 6th century, the buildings were destroyed by an earthquake. The bishop left the place and it was used in the subsequent period as a cemetery.

=== Pydna ===
Remains of two 4th-century and 6th-century basilicas were discovered at Pydna. The younger of the two basilicas was burned down by Bulgars after the conquest of Pydna. At the end of the 10th century, a 23 by 17 meters large basilica was built on their instead. In 1204, Frankish knights, probably after a siege, conquered the place and destroyed it. The remains of the basilica were turned into a fortress.

=== Kanalon Monastery ===
In 1055 the monks Joakim and Daniamos founded a monastery on the south side of Mount Olympus, located above the river Ziliana. The French archaeologist Heuzey dated the founding of the monastery to the year 955. After the monks abandoned the monastery at the beginning of the 20th century, it is now inhabited by nuns.

=== Monastery of the Blessed Virgin, Petra ===
In the 11th century, the Monastery of the Blessed Virgin (Isodion tis Theotoko) was built in Petra. Today there is a sanatorium in this place.

=== Agia Triada Monastery, Sparmos ===
At least since the year 1386 the existence of the monastery is documented. After being abandoned at the beginning of the 20th century, it has been inhabited by monks for several years now.

=== Panagia Church, Kontariotissa ===
The exact date of the construction of this church is unknown. The kind of the construction and the decoration inside the church point to the 7th century. It is interesting that obviously building material from the nearby Dion was used.

== Post-Byzantine ecclesiastical buildings ==
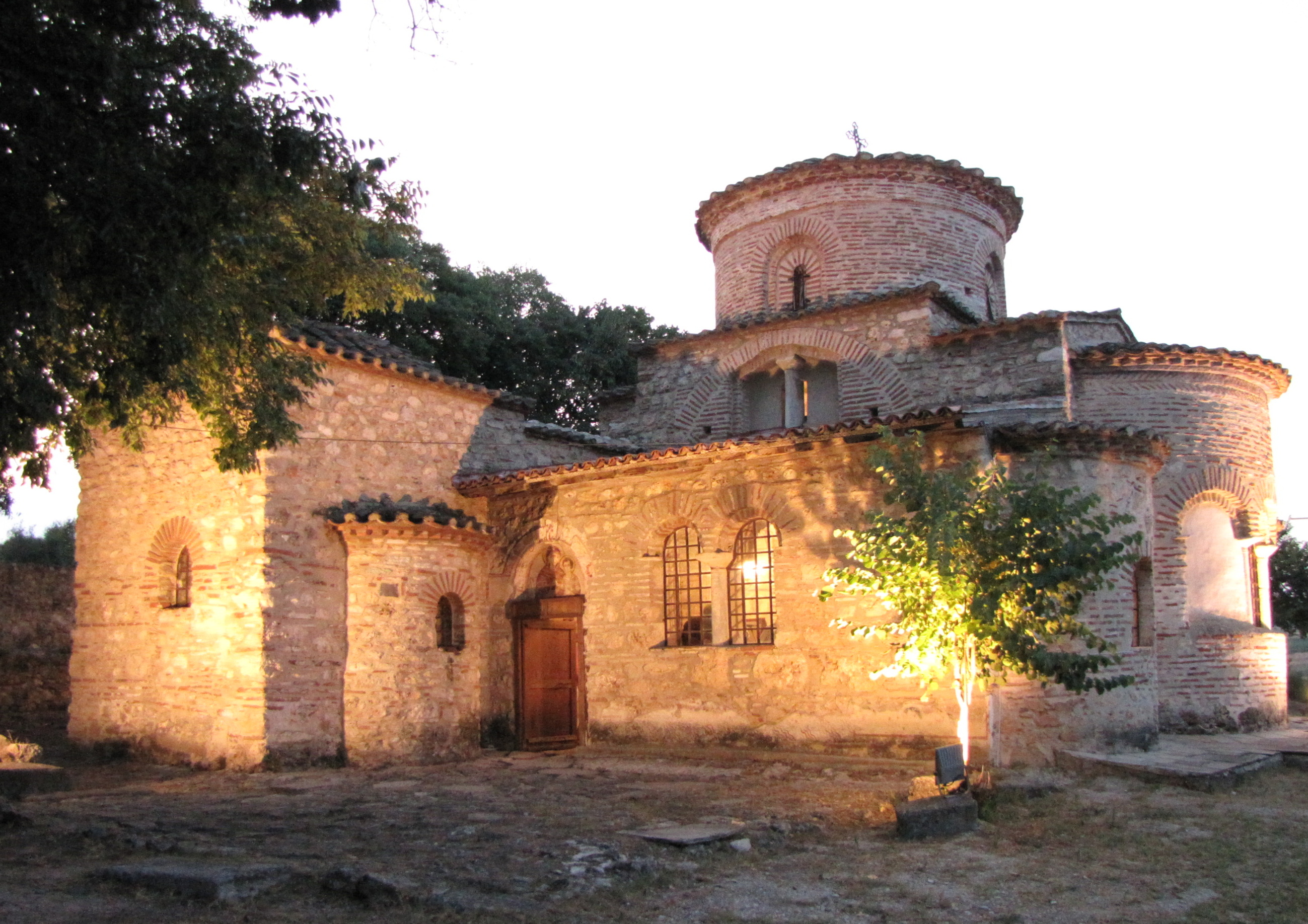
Church of the holy virgin, Kontariotissa

=== Agios Dionysios Monastery, Litochoro ===
In 1542 the monastery was founded by Saint Dionysios and dedicated to the Holy Trinity. During its history, the monastery was destroyed and rebuilt several times. In April 1943 it was blown up by the German Wehrmacht. The monks left the monastery and retreated to the Metochi founded in 1650, which gradually became the new monastery of Agios Dionysios.

=== Chapel of the Prophet Elias ===
The chapel was founded in the 16th century by Saint Dionysios, who probably lived there for a time. It stands on the top of Mount Profitis Elias, one of the peaks of Olympus, at an altitude of 2803 meters and is the highest chapel of the Orthodox Church in the world. The chapel is purportedly built on ancient ruins.

=== Klimadon Monastery ===
About 7 kilometers north of the town of Karya in 1640 the monastery of Agia Triada (Holy Trinity) was built. It was located at an altitude of 1320 meters and was also known by the name monastery Klymendou or simply as an old monastery (Palaiomonastirio). In 1823 it was partially burned down by the Ottomans, in 1833 one of the monks caused a fire that completely destroyed the monastery. Since 1913, a chapel stands at that place.

=== Agios Georgios Monastery, Ritini ===
Northeast of the town of Ritini lies the monastery of St. George. The oldest paintings of the monastery were dated to the year 1494. One of these frescoes shows St. George riding a dragon, another shows Jesus Christ on the cross. The other frescoes of the Katholikon date back to 1619. During World War II the monastery was abandoned.

=== Agios Athanasios Church, Ano Skotina ===
At the northern end of the village of Ano Skotina is the church of Agios Athanasios. The main part of the church and the narthex dates back to 1656, the other parts of the building were added later. The church is known for its frescoes.

== Modern ecclesiastical buildings ==
=== Monastery of St. Ephrem the Syrian, Kontariotissa ===
The monastery is located on a hill, 1.5 kilometers north of Kontariotissa. The foundation was in 1983, the nuns inhabited monastery is under the diocese of Kitros-Katerini.

=== Monastery of the Holy Virgin, Rapsani ===
The convent to the Blessed Virgin located east of Rapsani was founded in 1997.
