= Agia Triada Monastery, Sparmos =

Monastery in Elassona, Thessaly, Greece

Coordinates: 40.014056°N 22.316394°E

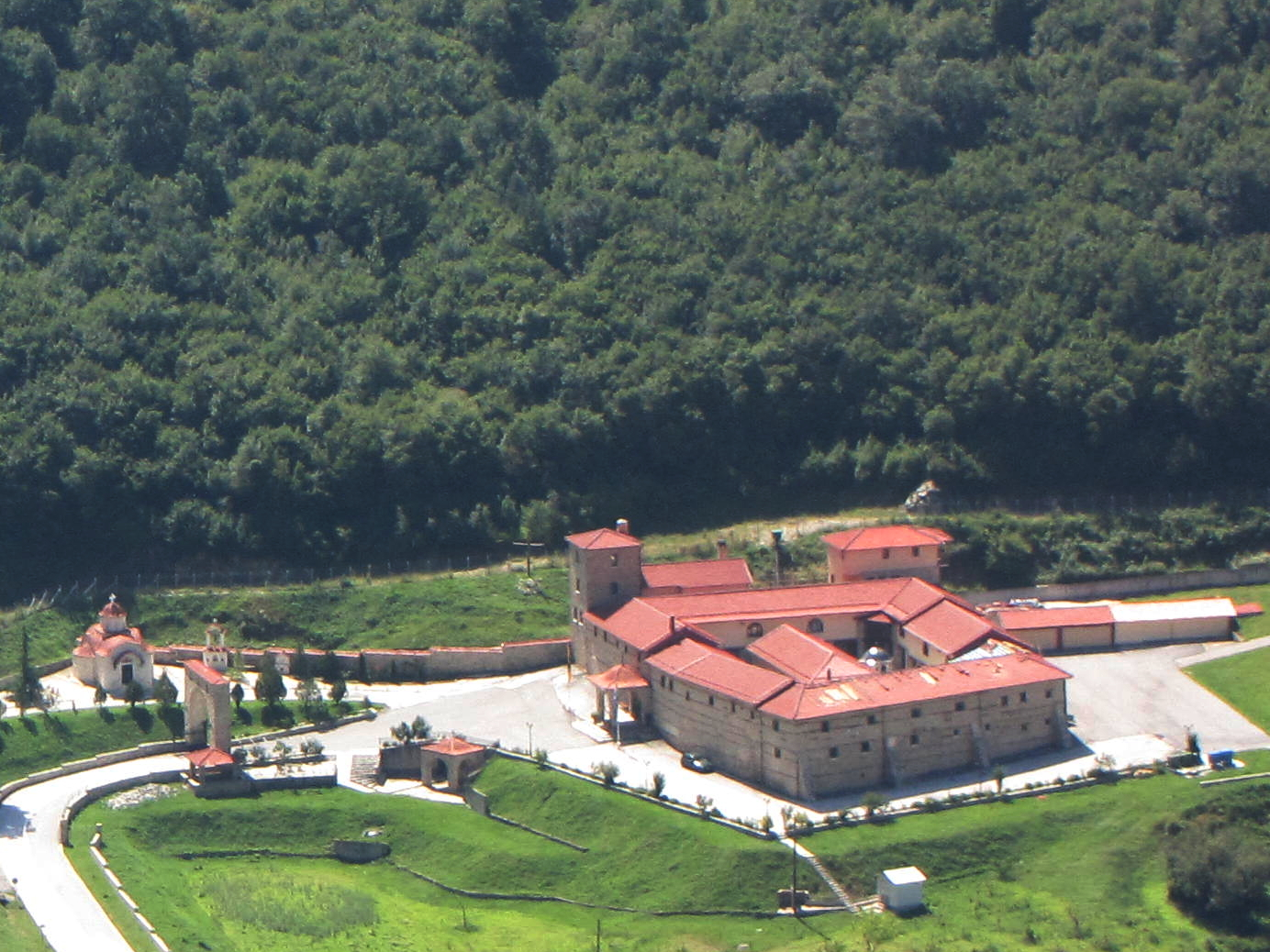
View of the monastery

The Agia Triada Monastery (Greek: Μονή Αγίας Τριάδος) is a Greek Orthodox monastery dedicated to the Holy Trinity (Agia Triada), on the southwestern slopes of Mount Olympus, Greece, near the village of Sparmos, whence it is also commonly known as Sparmou Monastery (Μονή Σπαρμού). Beside the monasteries Agios Dionysios and Kanalon it is one of the monasteries located at Mount Olympus.

== Location ==
The monastery is situated in the west of Mountain at a height of 990 m near the municipality of Elassona.

== History ==
The exact date of the foundation is not known. Records, however, prove that the monastery was inhabited since at least 1386. It is a stauropegic monastery, subordinated directly to the Patriarch of Constantinople (Istanbul).

The monastery's heyday began in the early 17th century, with its climax in the second half of the 18th century. The church was renovated in 1633. The oldest, very well-preserved icons come from this period. The cells of the monks were completed around 1739. The monastery became self-sufficient and had the financial resources to engage in external affairs. The most difficult years were these of the Ottoman reign.

The monastery was one of the liturgical schools of Orthodox Christianity as well as schools in Thessaloniki, Constantinople or Venice. Particularly educated monks not only ensured that the Greek language remained alive, but also educated the population. A library and a study room were set up, the bookbinding workshop was practiced by experienced monks from the 17th to the 19th century. Many of the manuscripts and books of that period were saved and are located in the Monastery of Panagia Olympiotissa. Some examples are exhibited in the museum.

During the Greek War of Independence against Ottoman rule the monastery supported the Greek fighters. Because of its location, far from the Turkish administration in Elassona, the monks could act relatively freely. They hid fighters and ammunition, cared for clothes and provisions.

From the middle of the 19th century the slow decline began, and in the second decade of the 20th century the last monks left the monastery. For about 80 years it was closed. On the initiative of the Metropolitan of Elassona, Basileios, the reconstruction began. In 2000, the first monks once again moved into the monastery.

== The monastery ==
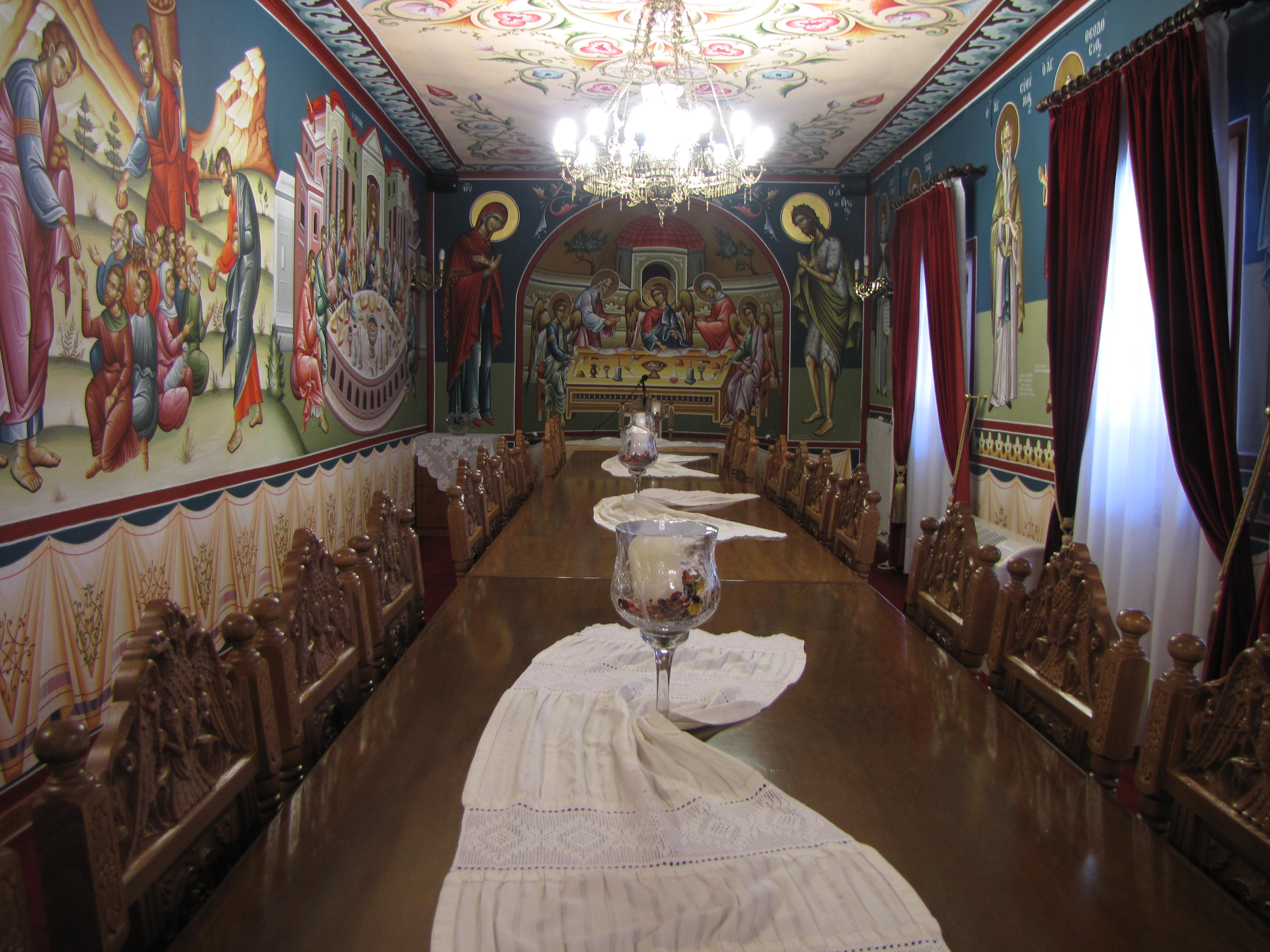
The refectory

A tower overlooks the high exterior walls, which are interrupted only by small, barred windows on the upper floors. In the northern part, four powerful retaining walls reinforce the statics of the outer wall, which is about one meter thick. The ground plan is a pentagon, the church (katholikon) is the central building. The monks' cells and other rooms like the refectory are laid out around the church. The wooden entrance door is covered with iron and is very stable.

To the inside of the monastery, the rooms of the second storey are supported by columns. Architecturally this way colonnades are formed, surrounding the church. Benches invite the visitor to rest. From the colonnades are the entrances to the museum and the small shop of the monks, as well as to the areas not accessible to the visitor of the monastery.

A small, very old well on the south side, donates holy water. In the south-west you can find the semantron and the bell-tower of the monastery. By hitting the semantron with a hammer, the monks are called to prayer.

Four chapels belong to the property, of which the chapel of Saint Charalambos is located on the site of the monastery. The chapel of All Saints, the chapel of the Theotokos and the chapel dedicated to John the Baptist are outside the grounds.

== The church ==
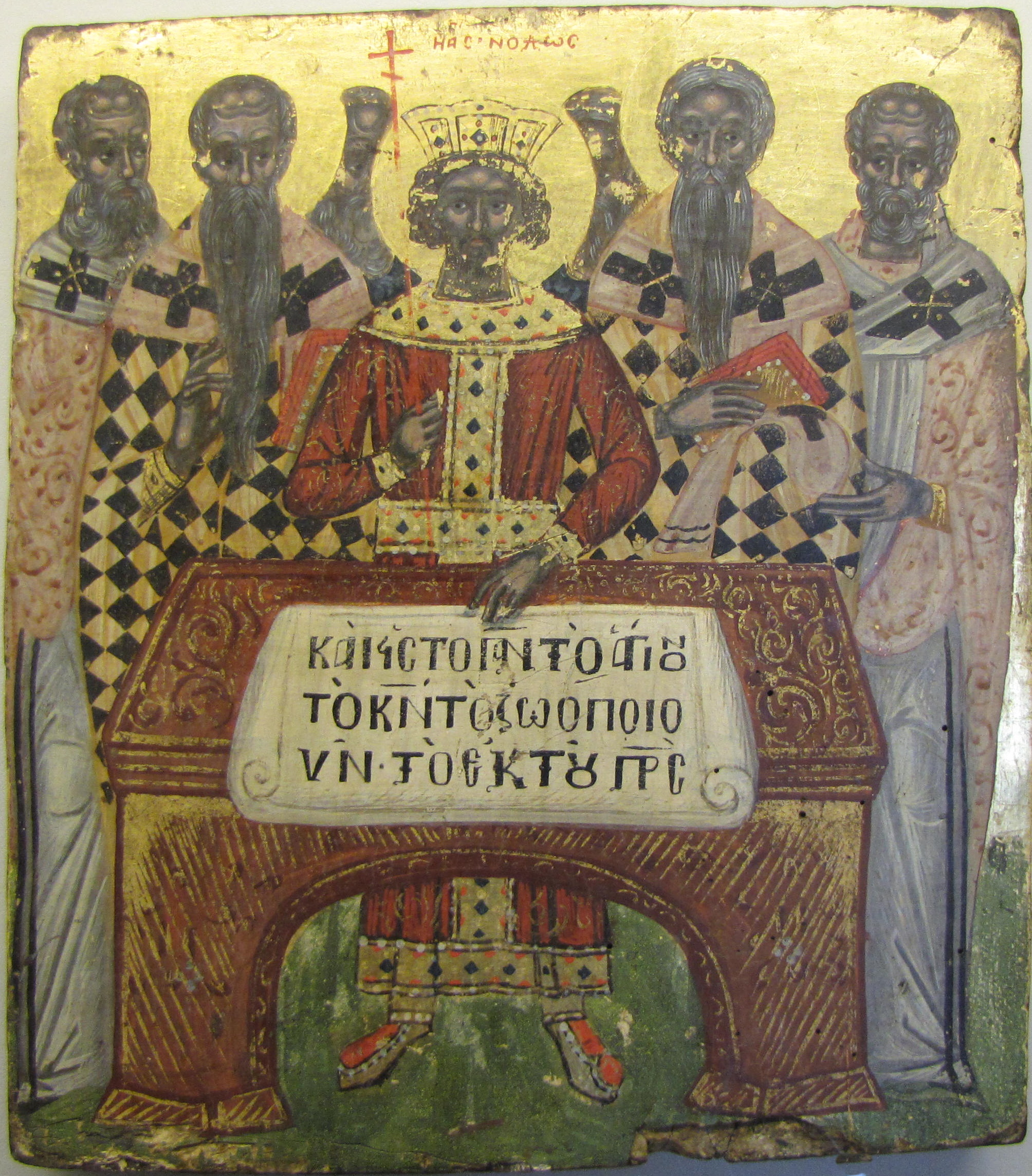
Icon from 1633

The church is 23 meters long, seven meters wide and the external walls are one meter thick. It is a simple, straight building, covered with natural stones and bricks. It consists of the narthex, the church room and the altar room, accessible only to the priests.

The small windows lay the paintings, the carvings, the icons in a half-dark. All the walls are painted with biblical motifs or motifs of saints. The ceiling is made of wood and is shaped into different patterns, painted in different colors. Several chandeliers with wax candles hang from the ceiling. They are decorated with porcelain bowls and ostrich eggs. The floor is made of marble with inlays.

The door to the altar room was adorned with gilded wood carvings and icons. The carvings of the iconostasis are pure craftsmanship. Some of the icons are more recent because the old originals were stolen.

== The museum ==
On quite a few square meters many exhibits are shown. Precious robes, the oldest icons of the monastery from the year 1633 and books, which were partly bound here. Old silver vessels used during the liturgy, precious embroidery and documents, which are witnesses of the monastery's history, are exhibited.

== Literature ==
- Ιερά Μονή Αγίας Τριάδας Σπαρμού Ολυμπου, Self-published by the monastery, 2006, ISBN 960-89151-0-4
- Free Travel Guide about the Olympus region Title: Mount Olympus - Ancient Sites, Museums, Monasteries and Churches
