= Kanalon Monastery =

- Μονή των Κανάλων
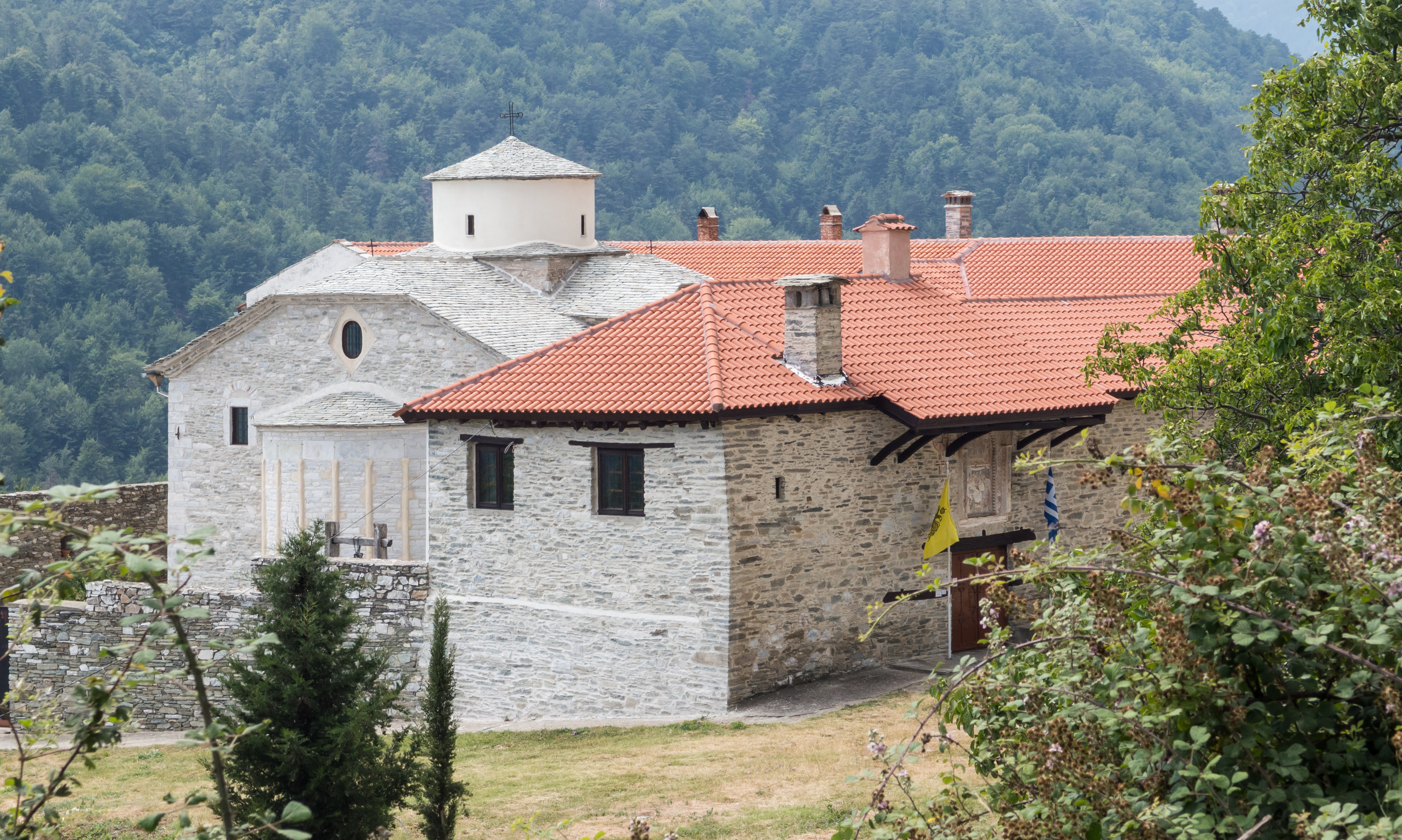
- View of the monastery

- Location within Greece
- Interactive map of Kanalon Monastery

Monastery information
- Full name: Monastery of the Nativity of the Theotokos of Kanalon
- Established: 9th or 11th century (traditional) attested since 1638
- Diocese: Metropolis of Elassona

People
- Founders: Monks Damian and Joachim

Site
- Coordinates: 40.0033°N 22.4621°E

The Kanalon Monastery (Greek: Μονή των Κανάλων), formally the Monastery of the Nativity of the Theotokos of Kanalon (Greek: Ιερά Μονή Γενεσίου της Θεοτόκου Κανάλων), is a Greek Orthodox convent in the north-east of the Greek region of Thessaly. Beside the monasteries of Agios Dionysios and Agia Triada, Sparmos it is one of the monasteries located at Mount Olympus.

== Location and name ==
The convent is located 8 kilometres (5.0 mi) east of Karya, on the road connecting it with Leptokarya, above the river Ziliana. The distance to Leptokarya is about 18 km, the distance (air line) to the ancient Leivithra is about 7 km. It is located at an altitude of 820 m and is surrounded by forest.

The name of the monastery refers to four wild brooks in the vicinity, called kanalia (κανάλια, "channels"), which combined to form the Ziliana river.

== History ==
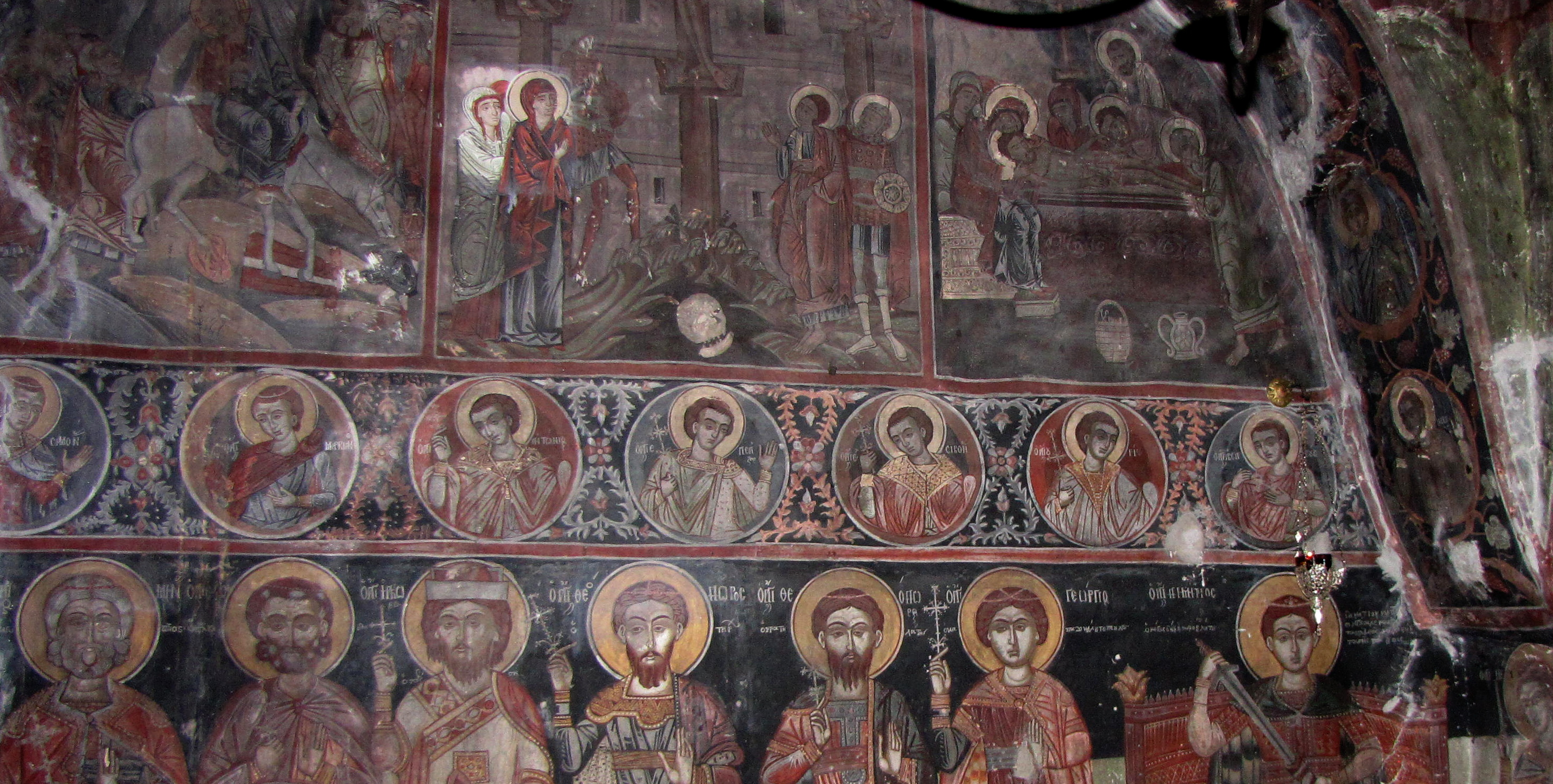
Frescoes in the chapel from 1638

According to tradition, the monastery was founded in 1055 by the monks Damian and Joachim, who dedicated it to the birth of the Holy Mother of God (Theotokos). The 19th-century French traveller Léon Heuzey, on the other hand, dated the foundation of the monastery to the ninth century. The first written record, however, is a 1638 inscription on the painting of frescoes for the chapel dedicated to All Saints. At that time, the complex consisted of the refectory and the katholikon. In 1681, a chapel dedicated to Saint Demetrios was added. The western wing, which now houses the cells of the inhabitants, was built later.

The monastery flourished in the 17th century, when large-scale restoration and decoration work took place in the complex. During the 19th century, the complex was raided and suffered considerable devastation. In 1881 the katholikon collapsed for unknown reasons, two years later it was rebuilt on the old foundations. Despite its stauropegic status, it was finally abandoned in 1930.

The monastery is operating again as a female convent since 2001. As of July 2017, the renovation work has been largely completed and the paintings in the chapel of Saint Demetrios are to be restored.

== Buildings ==
Parts of the original complex survive: the high fortified wall surrounding it, the refectory in the northern part, a handful of cells on the northeaster side, the katholikon, and the chapel of Saint Demetrios.

The katholikon is a three-aisled basilica topped by a dome. It had a separate upper gallery for women (gynaikonites). It was built in 1833, collapsed in 1881, and rebuilt in 1883 to the designs of the architect Efthymios Milios from Pentalofos. Its masonry is of locally quarried stone and marble. The chapel of Saint Demetrios is a small, single-room building that was built in 1684 and painted in 1689–1696. The small cemetery chapel dedicated to All Saints is the oldest building, with frescoes dating to 1638. The refectory is an elongated building with three apses on its eastern end, which are also decorated with frescoes.
