= Monastery of St. Ephrem the Syrian =

Coordinates: 40.238333°N 22.451389°E

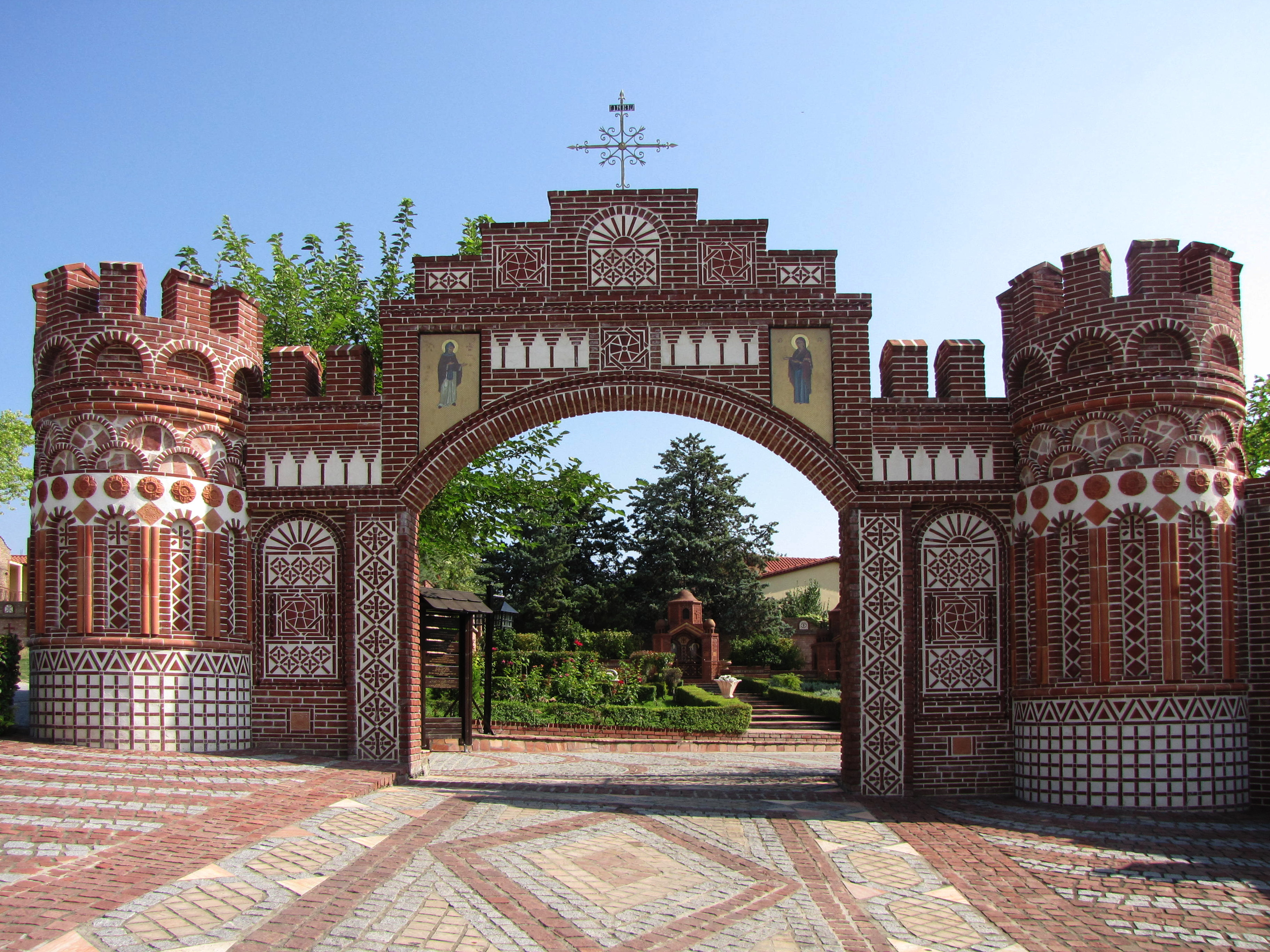
Monastery Ephraim, entrance

The Monastery of St. Ephrem the Syrian (Greek Ιερά Γυναικεία Κοινοβιακή Μονή Οσίου Εφραίμ του Σύρου), named after Ephraim the Syrian, was founded in 1983, is inhabited by nuns and one of the youngest monasteries near Mount Olympus.

== Location ==
The monastery is located on a 151 meter high hill, 1.5 kilometers north of the village Kontariotissa and 6 kilometers southwest of the city Katerini.

== The monastery ==
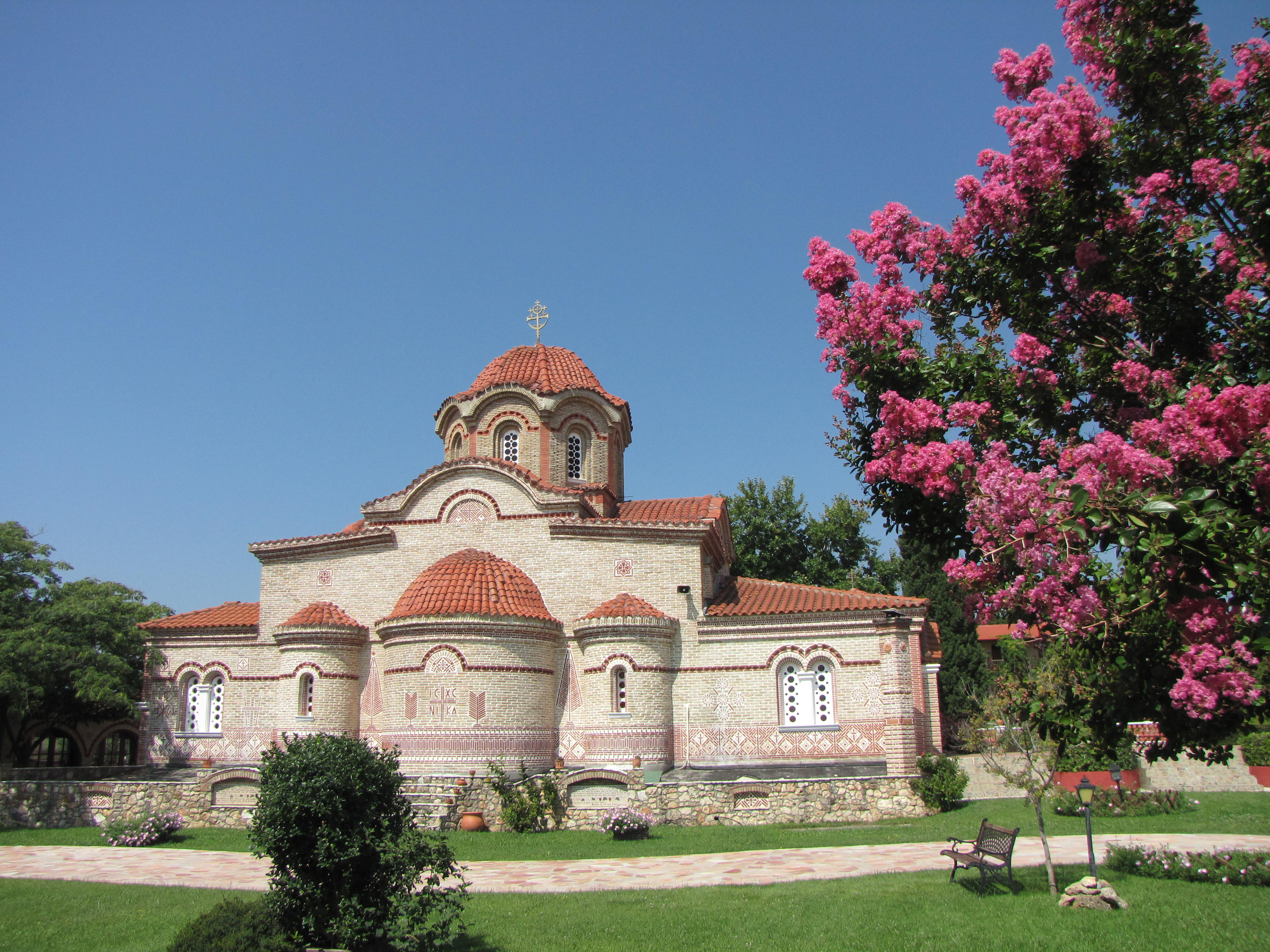
The main church of the convent

The monastery is subordinate to the diocese Kitros Katerini, belonging to the archdiocese of Athens.

The property stretches over approximately 21 hectares and is surrounded by a wall. Outside the actual monastery, there is an ornamental garden, a church where weddings and christening take place, and an olive grove. The center of the complex is a square planted with a plane tree, bordered on the west by an ornamental garden and then by the church named Agia Irini and the administrative building. The main church, Katholikon, lies to the east of it. The buildings on the south side serve to entertain the guests, here is also one of the two exhibitions housed. In this one the artisan made products of the nuns are sold. The Sisters' home to the north is the largest building in the monastery. To the east of the church there is another ornamental garden and the exhibition offering handicraft products made by the nuns. In the north of the garden is an aviary, in which peacocks, pigeons and chickens are held.

== The monastery life ==
In addition to the general liturgies, individual studies and prayers of the nuns shape the everyday life of the monastery.

According to their abilities, the nuns work alongside other works:

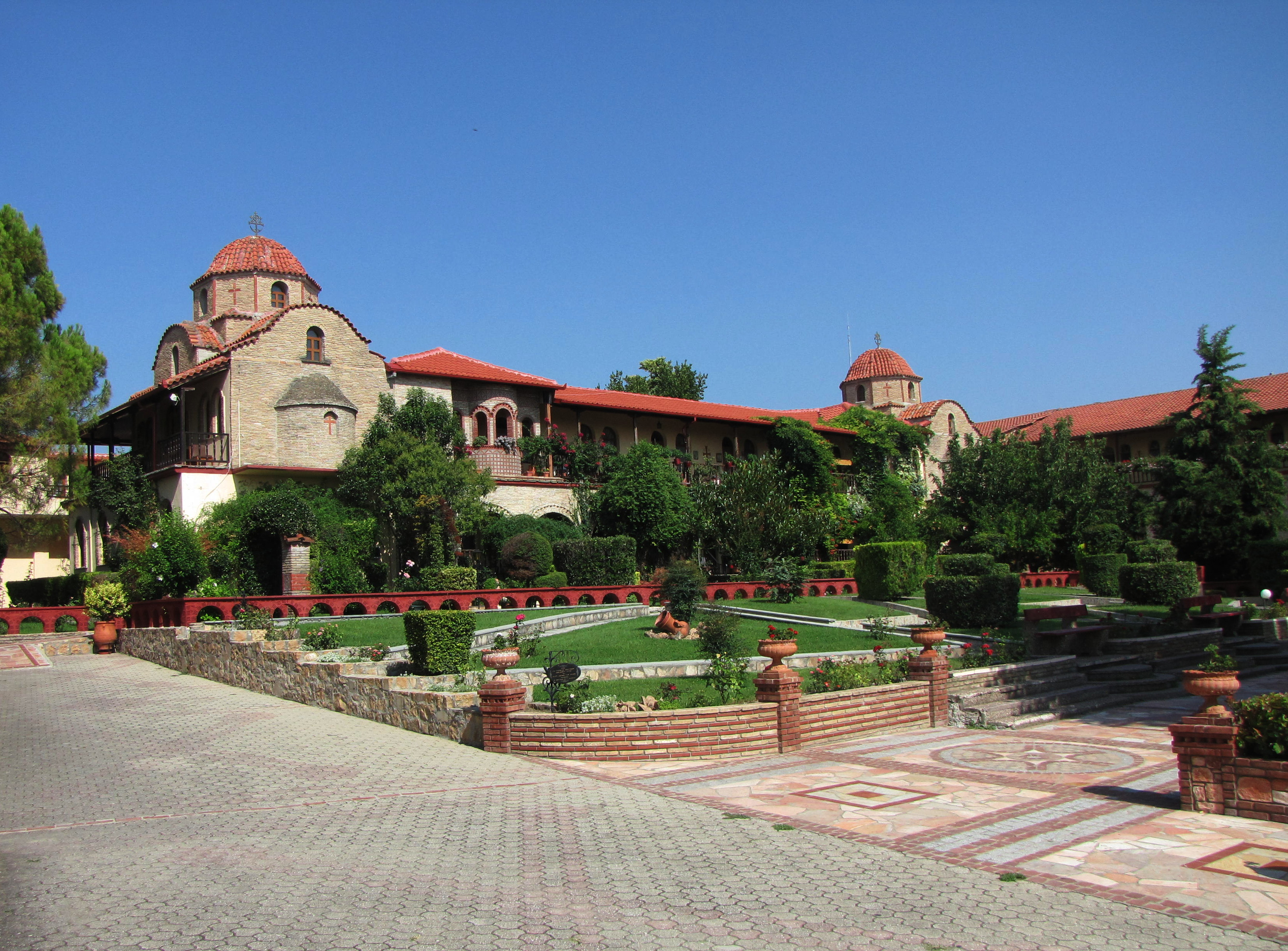
Church Agia Irini and the administrative building

Artistic activities

- Byzantine saint painting
- Engravings on icons
- Making mosaics
- Production of candlesticks and decorative candles
- Production of pottery, jewelry and simple decorative objects

Craftmanship activities

- Horticulture, including fruit and olive growing
- Floriculture
- Poultry farming
- Production of traditional products, such as pasta and sweets
