= Chapel of the Prophet Elias, Mount Olympus =

Orthodox chapel at the Mount Olympus in Greece

Coordinates: 40.097966°N 22.364606°E

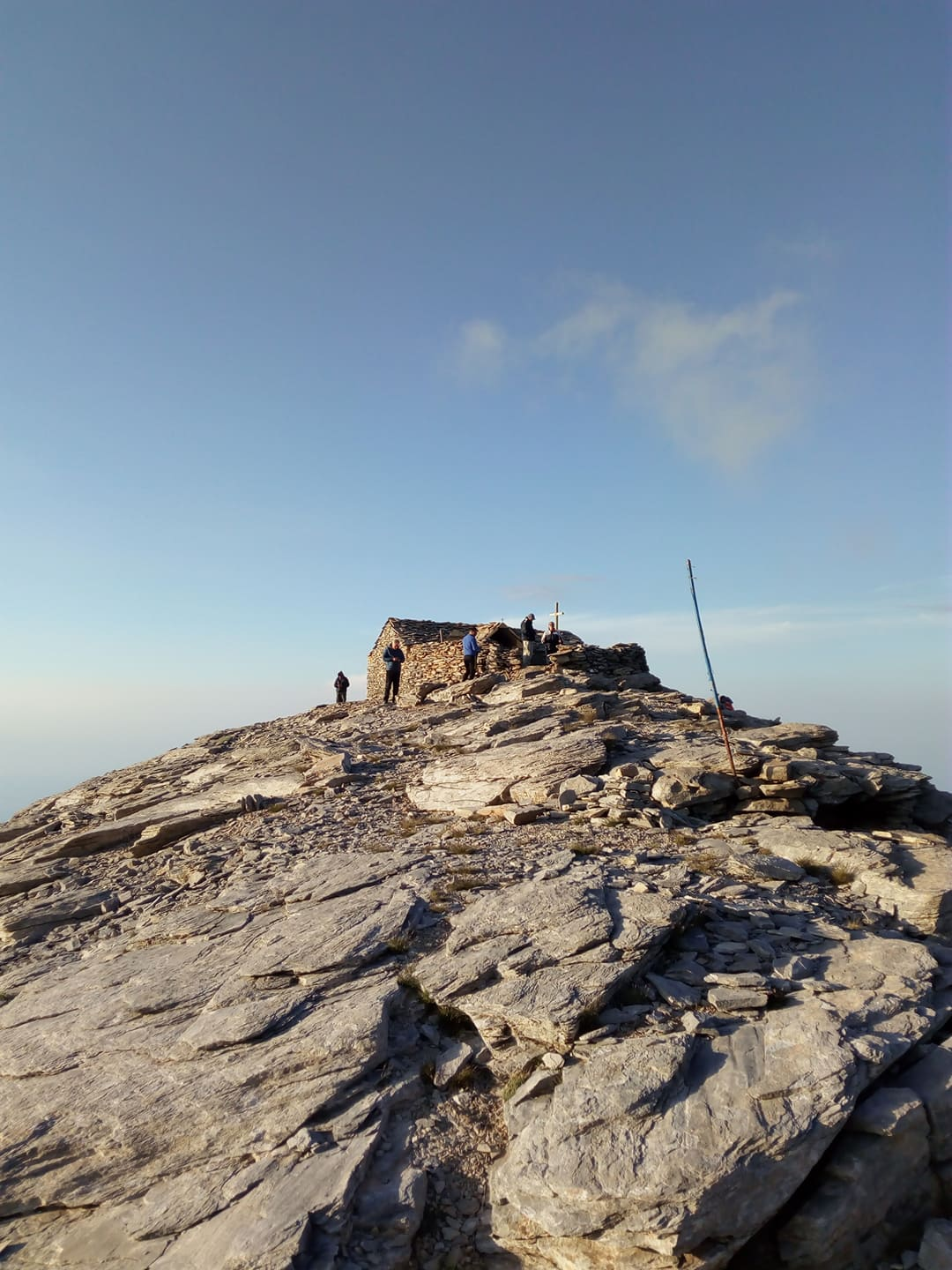
The chapel

Near the summits of Mount Olympus lies the chapel of the Prophet Elias (Greek: εξωκκλήσι του Προφήτη Ηλία). The Eastern Orthodox Church celebrates the saint on July 20.

== Location ==
The 2,803-meter-high (9,196 ft) peak of Profitis Ilias (Προφήτης Ηλίας) is located near the highest peaks of Mount Olympus (Mytikas and Stefani). The closest mountain huts are the Apostolidis Hut (430 meters away) and the Christos Kakkalos Hut (around 600 meters away).

== History ==
Saint Dionysius, founder of the Monastery of the Holy Trinity (nowadays known as Monastery Agios Dionysios), also founded the chapel of the Prophet Elias in the 16th century. It was built on the ruins of an ancient structure. Dionysus, who practised an ascetic life, is said to have lived in the church at times. The chapel is the highest ecclesiastical building of the Orthodox Church worldwide.

== The building ==
The chapel was built on the top of Mount Profitis Ilias; the main building materials were the surrounding stones. The floor of the chapel is covered with stone slabs, the outer walls are made of layered stones, without further connecting material. Covered with stone slabs, the roof is supported by a solid wooden construction to support the snow load. An atrium is protected on the eastern and southern sides by a natural stone wall, which has an entrance on the north side. The low entrance to the chapel is on the south side of the building.

Inside hang some icons; a small altar, framed by icons depicting saints of the Orthodox Church, gives believers the opportunity to light a candle.
