= Agios Dionysios Monastery, Olympus =

Greek Orthodox monastery near Mount Olympus, Greece

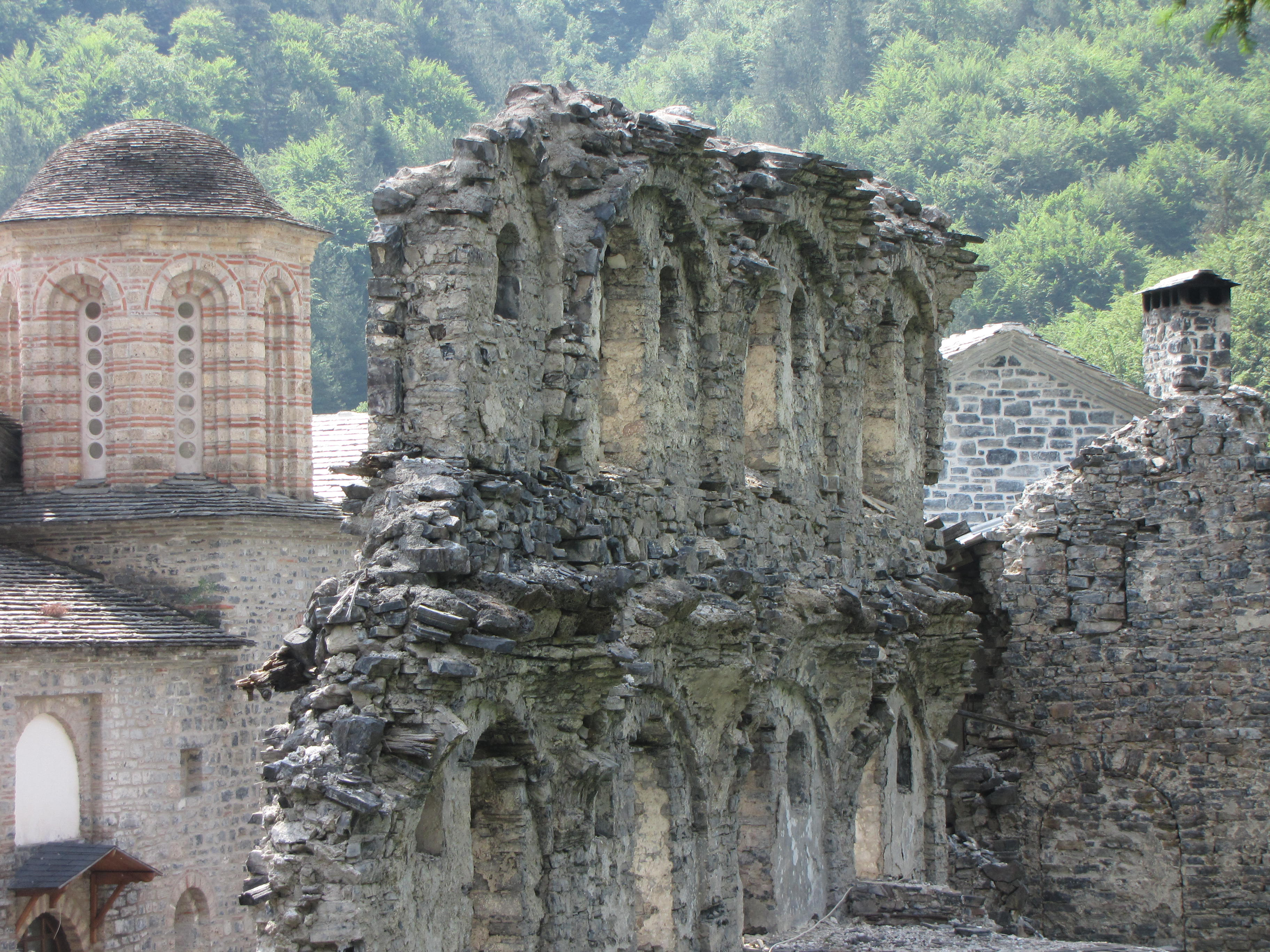
The old monastery of Agios Dionysios

The Monastery of Agios Dionysios in Olympus (Greek: Μονή Αγίου Διονυσίου εν Ολύμπω) is a Greek Orthodox monastery on the slopes of Mount Olympus, the most important monastery in the Pieria Prefecture. It is located at the Enipeas ravine at an altitude of 850 m (40.094°N 22.429°E).

The original monastery, established in 1542, was destroyed by the Germans in 1943. A new monastery was established at a distance of some 5 km to the northeast of the old one, closer to the town of Litochoro (40.118°N 22.484°E). Today, the Agios Dionysios Monastery is a stavropegic monastery, subordinated directly to the Patriarch of Constantinople.

Beside the monasteries Kanalon and Agia Triada, Sparmos, Agios Dionysios is one of the monasteries located at Mount Olympus.

== Name ==
Originally the name of the ancient monastery was Agia Triada (Greek: Αγία Τριάδα) meaning Holy Trinity. In time however, the name of its founder, Saint Dionysios of Olympus, has prevailed. The new monastery was named directly after Saint Dionysios.

== Old Monastery ==
The old monastery was founded and devoted to the Holy Trinity by Saint Dionysios in 1542. Surrounded by strong high walls with a sizable watchtower, it resembles a small fortress. During various conflicts it served as a shelter for civilians, as well as fighting troops. The monastery was destroyed and rebuilt several times throughout its history. It was destroyed in 1821 by Veli Pasha and again by the German Wehrmacht in April 1943. The German military first bombed the monastery and later demolished it with explosives to prevent its use as refuge for Greek resistance fighters. Today visitors can visit the old monastery's ruins just off the road from Litochoro to Prionia.

=== The chapel of Saint Dionysios ===
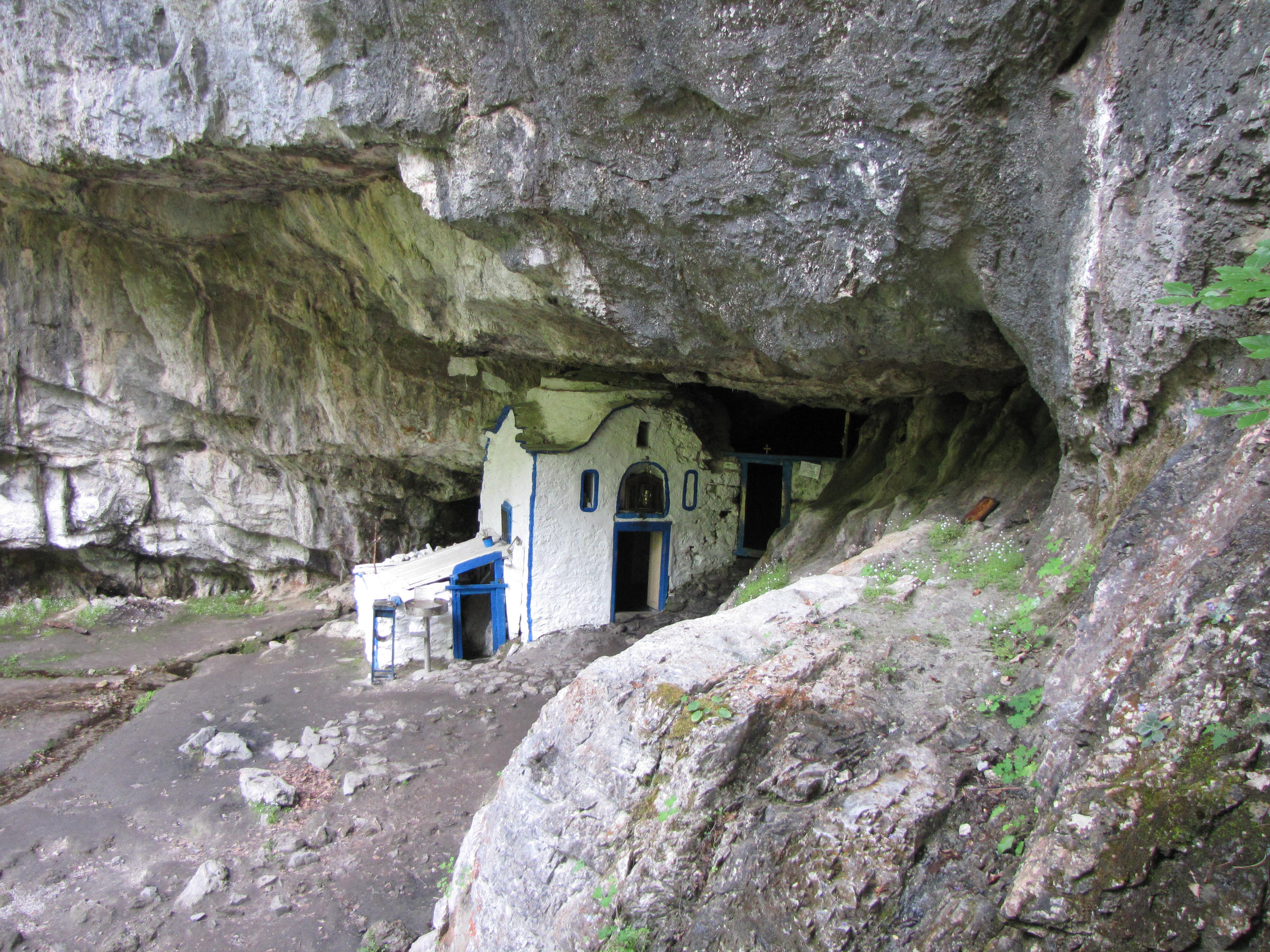
The chapel of Saint Dionysios

The chapel of Saint Dionysios is about a twenty minute walk from the old monastery. It is located on the Enipeas River in a southeasterly direction from the monastery, built under an overhanging rock just above a spring. The chapel consists of a small devotional space where the saint celebrated the sacred liturgy during his time as a hermit and a small shed which served as him as a place to sleep.

== New Monastery ==
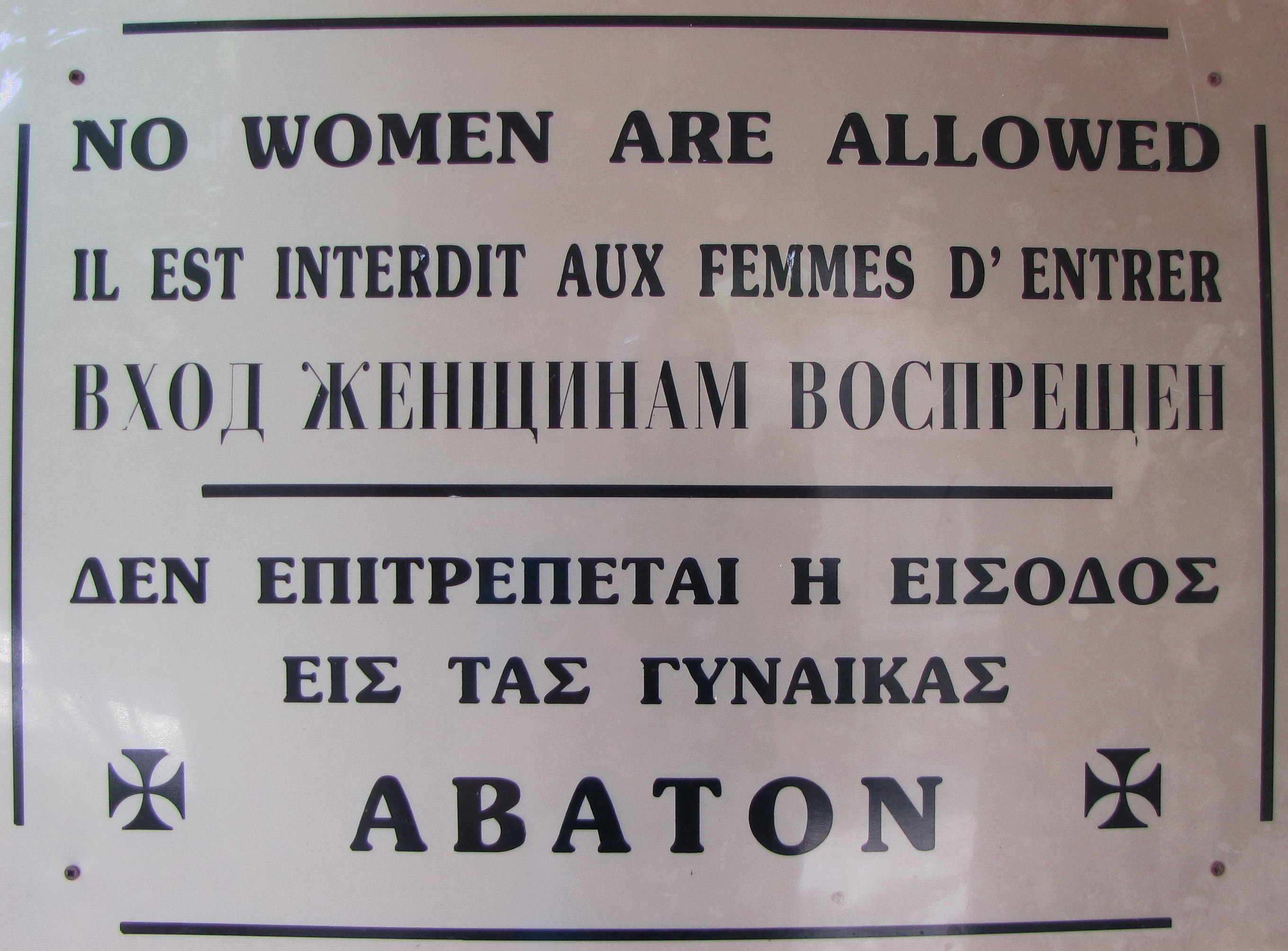
Sign informing visitors of the abaton rule.

The monks abandoned the destroyed monastery and moved into the Metochion, the estate of the monastery. The Metochion was founded in 1650 and consisted of land for farming, a church, economic buildings, and a building in which the monks lived.

After the Second World War this estate was gradually expanded into a full monastery. The older part of the new monastery is equipped with a heavy iron door and thus separated from the rest of the compound. It contains the monks' quarters, the refectory, and the administrative building. As is usual with Greek Orthodox monasteries, this part of the monastery is subject to the abaton ("inaccessible") rule, prohibiting access to female visitors. Just outside are the stables, workshops, and cheese factory. All buildings outside the abaton, such as the new church or the museum, were built after 1985.

=== The church ===
The monastery church was built in classical orthodox style, though there are many special features inside in addition to the usual sumptuous decor of an Orthodox church. Many of the church's chairs, standing consoles, and other wooden items are decorated with elaborate marquetry, the inserts of which are made of ivory and mother-of-pearl. Next to a depiction of the resurrection of Jesus Christ is a little basket with notes and ball-point pens. Believers who want to make a request to Christ are encouraged to write on the notes.

=== The museum ===
To the east of the complex is the museum. In the monastery's troubled times monks hid many monastic treasures in secret vaults in the areas around the old and new monastery. A selection of these rescued treasures are exhibited in the museum:

- Three silver skulls, into which bone pieces of saints were worked, are exhibited together with other relics.
- Old documents, including the document from the year 949 of the Islamic calendar (1542 AD), in which the Ottoman occupiers allow the repair (in fact probably the foundation) of a monastery on Mount Olympus.
- Through a magnifying glass one can admire very fine wood carvings within a metal cross.
- An epitaph, embroidered with gold threads, made in 1578-79 by Arsenius, a monk of the Meteora monasteries.
- Some of the icons rescued from the old monastery.

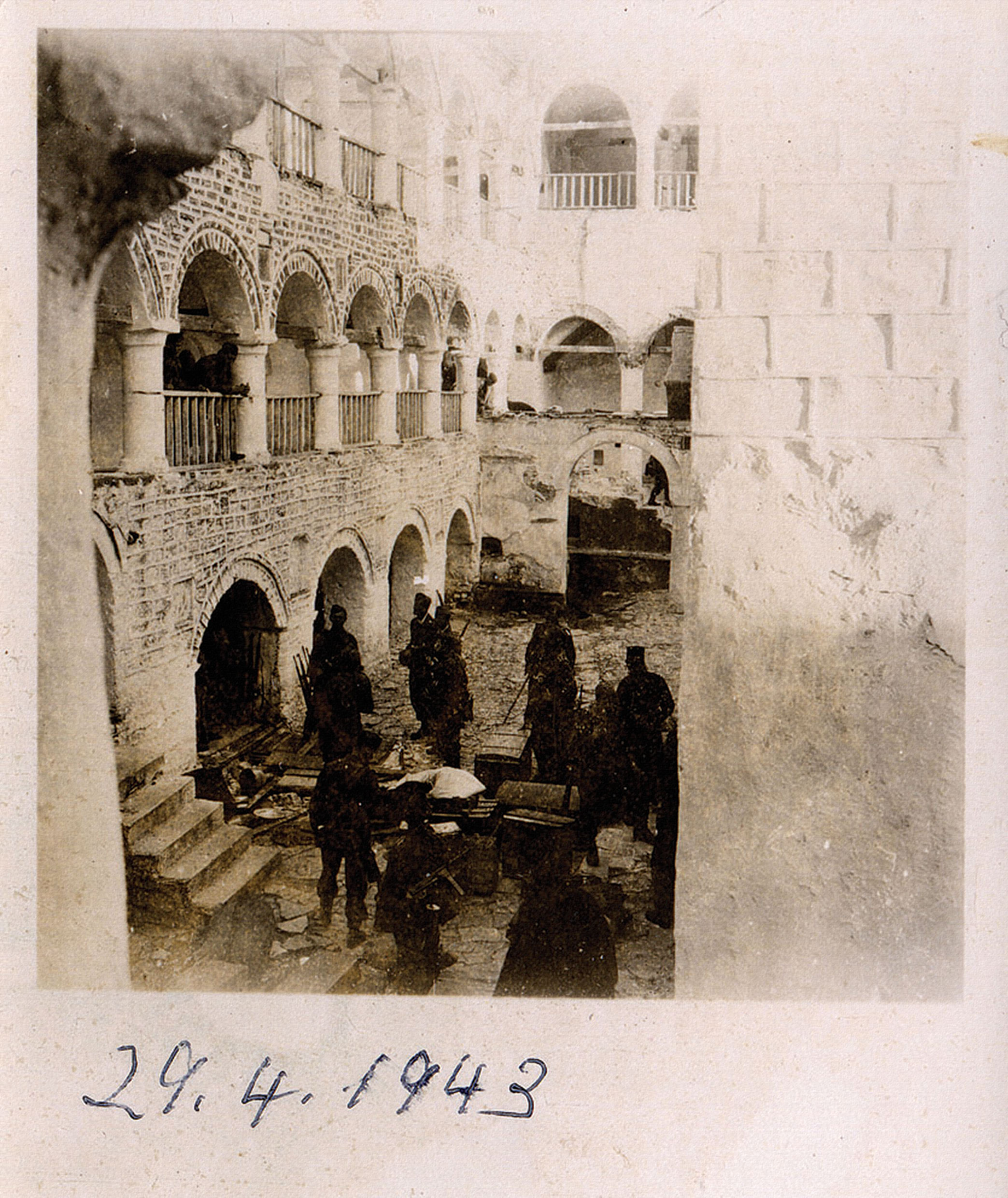
Photo of German soldiers preparing to blow up the old Agios Dionysios monastery in April 1943.

One inconspicuous, but significant exhibit in the museum is a collection of framed black-and-white photographs which hang near the entrance. They show the old monastery in the mountains just before its destruction. A soldier of the German Wehrmacht named Karl Faber took these pictures secretly and sent them to the monastery some years ago.

== Literature ==
- Holy Patriarchal and Stavropegic Monastery of St. Dionysios of Olympus: I Iera Patriarchiki ke Stavropigiaki Moni tou Agiou Dionysiou tou en Olymbou. Publisher: Holy Patriarchal and Stavropegic Monastery of St. Dionysios of Olympus, 2014
- Free Travel Guide about the Olympus region Title: Mount Olympus - Ancient Sites, Museums, Monasteries and Churches
