= Katholikon =

Major church in Eastern Orthodoxy

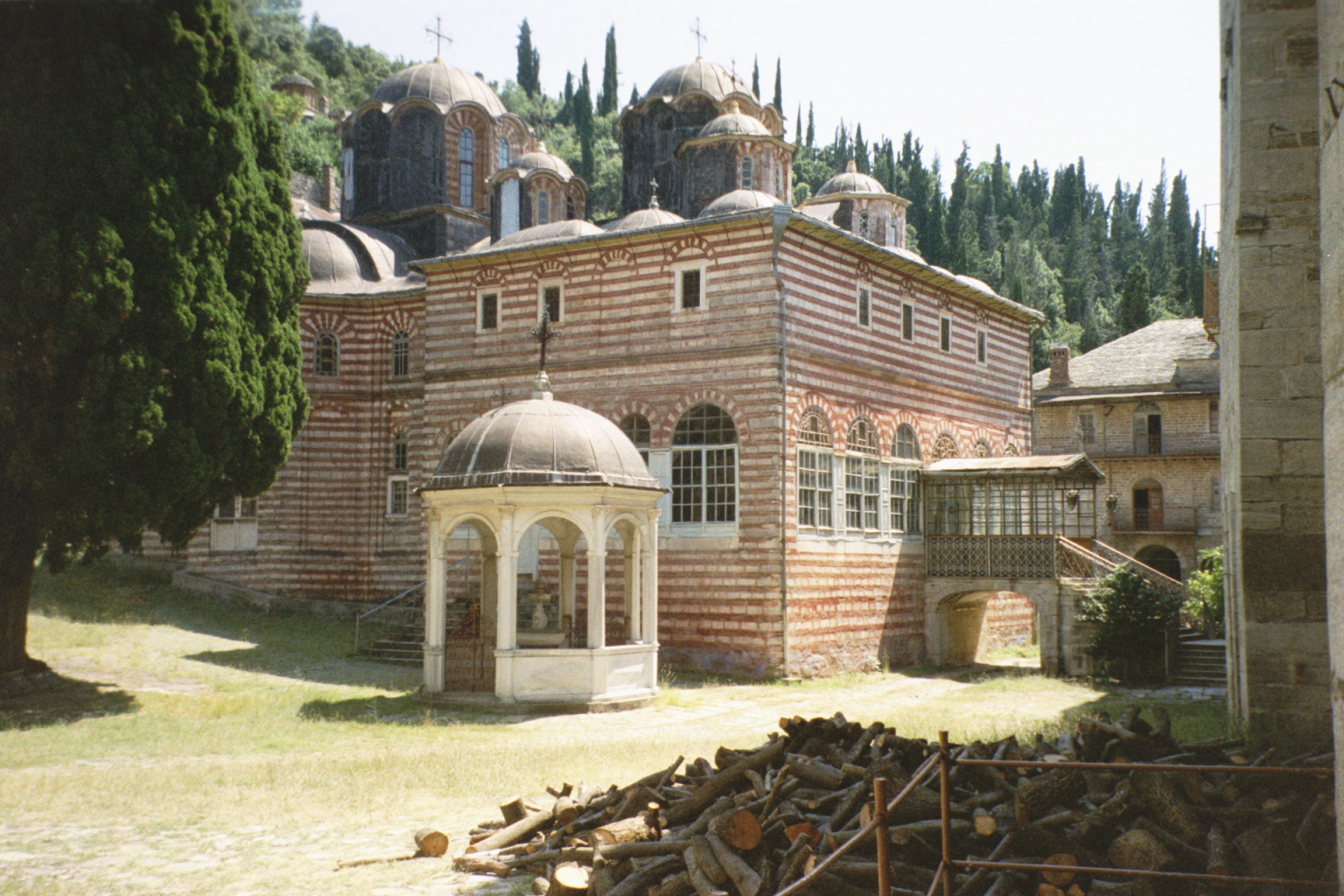
The katholikon at Zographou monastery on Mount Athos

A katholikon or catholicon (Greek: καθολικόν) or sobor (Church Slavonic: съборъ) refers to one of three things in the Eastern Orthodox Church:

- The cathedral of a diocese.
- The major church building (temple) of a monastery corresponding to a conventual church in Western Christianity.
- A large church in a city at which all the faithful of the city gather to celebrate certain important feasts rather than go to their local parish church.

The name derives from the fact that it is typically the largest church where all gather together to celebrate the major feast days of the liturgical year. In Russia, it is common for a katholikon to have a smaller church in the basement which can be more easily heated in the winter. A katholikon may have special architectural features in it, such as a cathedra (episcopal throne), or both an esonarthex (inner-narthex) and exonarthex (outer narthex), used for special services such as the Paschal vigil or a lity.

The word katholikon is often translated into English as cathedral rather than assembly and that can cause confusion. In Saint Isaac's Cathedral in Saint Petersburg, Russia, for example, there is a placard in Russian and in English describing the building as having been кафедральный собор, rendered in English as the "cathedraly cathedral". However an Eastern Orthodox diocese may have several katholikons, only one of which is the bishop's cathedral, other important churches being known as katholicons. The rector of such churches is usually an archpriest.

== See also ==
- Eastern Orthodox church architecture
