= List of settlements in the Larissa regional unit =

This is a list of settlements in the Larissa regional unit, Greece.

- Achilleio
- Aetolofos
- Agia
- Agia Sophia
- Agioi Anargyroi
- Agios Georgios, Farsala
- Agios Georgios, Kileler
- Agnanteri
- Aigani
- Akri
- Alexandrini
- Amouri
- Ampelakia
- Ampelia
- Ampelonas
- Amygdalea
- Amygdali
- Anatoli
- Anavra
- Argyropouli
- Armenio
- Asprochoma
- Azoros
- Chalki
- Chalkiades
- Chara
- Damasi
- Damasouli
- Dasolofos
- Deleria
- Dendra Tyrnavou
- Dendra, Farsala
- Dilofo, Farsala
- Dilofo, Kileler
- Dimitra
- Dolichi
- Domeniko
- Doxaras
- Drymos
- Elafos
- Elassona
- Elateia
- Eleftheres
- Eleftherio
- Eretria
- Evangelismos
- Evangelismos, Elassona
- Falanni
- Farmaki
- Farsala
- Flampouro
- Galanovrysi
- Galini
- Gerakari
- Gerania
- Giannota
- Giannouli
- Glafki
- Gonnoi
- Itea
- Kalamaki
- Kallipefki
- Kallithea Elassonos
- Kallithea, Farsala
- Kalochori
- Kalyvia
- Kalyvia Analipseos
- Karitsa
- Karya
- Kastri
- Kato Vasilika
- Katochori
- Kefalovryso
- Kileler
- Kleisoura
- Koilada
- Kokkino Nero
- Kokkinogeio
- Kokkinopilos
- Koutsochero
- Koutsoufliani
- Krania, Elassona
- Kranea, Tempi
- Krannonas
- Krini
- Kritiri
- Kryovrysi
- Kyparissos
- Kypselochori
- Larissa
- Lefki
- Livadi
- Lofos, Elassona
- Lofos, Farsala
- Loutro, Elassona
- Loutro, Larissa
- Lygaria
- Lykoudi
- Magoula
- Makrychori
- Mandra
- Marmarini
- Mavrovouni
- Megalo Eleftherochori
- Mega Evydrio
- Mega Monastiri
- Megalovryso
- Melia
- Melissa
- Melissochori
- Melivoia
- Mesochori
- Metaxochori
- Mikro Vouno
- Mikrolithos
- Milea
- Moschochori
- Myra
- Namata
- Narthaki
- Nea Lefki
- Nees Karyes
- Neo Perivoli
- Neraida
- Neromyloi
- Nessonas
- Nikaia
- Niki
- Olympiada
- Omolio
- Omorfochori
- Ossa
- Palaiokastro
- Palaiopyrgos
- Paliampela
- Paliaskia
- Parapotamos
- Perichora
- Petroto
- Platanoulia
- Platykampos
- Polydameio
- Polyneri
- Potamia
- Pournari
- Praitori
- Prinias
- Psychiko
- Pyrgetos
- Pythio
- Rachoula
- Rapsani
- Revmatia
- Rodia
- Sarantaporo
- Sitochoro
- Skiti
- Sklithro
- Skopia, Elassona
- Skopia, Farsala
- Skotoussa
- Sotirio
- Sotiritsa
- Sparmos
- Spilia
- Stavros
- Stefanovouno
- Stomio
- Strintzios
- Sykaminea
- Sykia
- Sykourio
- Tempi
- Terpsithea
- Tsapournia
- Tsaritsani
- Tyrnavos
- Valanida
- Vamvakou
- Varkos
- Vasilis
- Verdikoussa
- Vlachogianni
- Vounaina
- Vryotopos
- Vrysia
- Ypereia
- Zappeio
- Zoodochos Pigi

== See also ==
- List of towns and villages in Greece
