= Ossa, Larissa =

Ossa Όσσα
- Community
- Location within Greece
- Coordinates: 39°44.8′N 22°34.6′E
- Country: Greece
- Administrative region: Thessaly
- Regional unit: Larissa
- Municipality: Tempi
- Municipal unit: Nessonas

Area
  - Community: 13.509 km^{2} (5.216 sq mi)
- Elevation: 135 m (443 ft)

Population (2021)
  - Community: 481
  - Density: 35.6/km^{2} (92.2/sq mi)
- Time zone: UTC+2 (EET)
  - Summer (DST): UTC+3 (EEST)
- Postal code: 400 06
- Area code: +30-2495
- Vehicle registration: PI

Ossa (Greek: Όσσα) is a village and a community of the Tempi municipality. Before the 2011 local government reform it was part of the municipality of Nessonas, of which it was a municipal district. The 2021 census recorded 481 inhabitants in the community of Ossa. The community of Ossa covers an area of 13.509 km^{2}.

== See also ==
- List of settlements in the Larissa regional unit
