= Namata =

Namata (Greek: Νάματα) may refer to:

- Namata, Kozani, a village in the Kozani regional unit, Greece
- Namata, Larissa, a village in the Larissa regional unit, Greece
- Namata, Fiji, a village in the Tailevu Province, Fiji.
