= Akri, Larissa =

Akri Άκρη
- Community
- Location within Greece
- Coordinates: 39°59.9′N 21°57.9′E
- Country: Greece
- Administrative region: Thessaly
- Regional unit: Larissa
- Municipality: Elassona
- Municipal unit: Elassona

Area
  - Community: 19.496 km^{2} (7.527 sq mi)
- Elevation: 950 m (3,120 ft)

Population (2021)
  - Community: 91
  - Density: 4.7/km^{2} (12/sq mi)
- Time zone: UTC+2 (EET)
  - Summer (DST): UTC+3 (EEST)
- Postal code: 402 00
- Area code: +30-2493
- Vehicle registration: PI

Akri (Greek: Άκρη, Greek pronunciation: ['akɾi]) is a village and a community of the Elassona municipality. Before the 2011 local government reform it was part of the municipality of Antichasia, of which it was a municipal district. The community of Akri covers an area of 58.354 km^{2}.

== Population ==
Historical population
Year	Pop.	±%
2001	192	—
2011	191	−0.5%
2021	91	−52.4%

== See also ==
- List of settlements in the Larissa regional unit
