= Loutro, Elassona =

Loutro Λουτρό
- Community
- Location within Greece
- Coordinates: 39°58′N 21°55.9′E
- Country: Greece
- Administrative region: Thessaly
- Regional unit: Larissa
- Municipality: Elassona
- Municipal unit: Elassona

Area
  - Community: 29.165 km^{2} (11.261 sq mi)
- Elevation: 740 m (2,430 ft)

Population (2021)
  - Community: 491
  - Density: 16.8/km^{2} (43.6/sq mi)
- Time zone: UTC+2 (EET)
  - Summer (DST): UTC+3 (EEST)
- Postal code: 402 00
- Area code: +30-2493
- Vehicle registration: PI

Loutro (Greek: Λουτρό, Greek pronunciation: [lut'ɾo]) is a village and a community of the Elassona municipality. Before the 2011 local government reform, Loutro was part of the municipality of Antichasia, of which it was a municipal district and the seat. The community of Loutro covers an area of 29.165 km^{2}.

== History ==
The village is over 500 years old. It is recorded as village and as "Lutro" in the Ottoman Tahrir Defter number 101 dating to 1521.

== Population ==
Historical population
Year	Pop.	±%
2001	670	—
2011	702	+4.8%
2021	491	−30.1%

== See also ==
- List of settlements in the Larissa regional unit
