= Megalo Eleftherochori =

Megalo Eleftherochori Μεγάλο Ελευθεροχώρι
- Community
- Location within Greece
- Coordinates: 39°41.4′N 22°4.7′E
- Country: Greece
- Administrative region: Thessaly
- Regional unit: Larissa
- Municipality: Elassona
- Municipal unit: Potamia

Area
  - Community: 40.779 km^{2} (15.745 sq mi)
- Elevation: 420 m (1,380 ft)

Population (2021)
  - Community: 435
  - Density: 10.7/km^{2} (27.6/sq mi)
- Time zone: UTC+2 (EET)
  - Summer (DST): UTC+3 (EEST)
- Postal code: 402 00
- Area code: +30-24920
- Vehicle registration: PI

Megalo Eleftherochori (Greek: Μεγάλο Ελευθεροχώρι, pronounced [meˈɣalo elefθeroˈxori]) is a village and a community of the Elassona municipality. Before the 2011 local government reform it was a part of the municipality of Potamia, of which it was a municipal district. The community of Megalo Eleftherochori covers an area of 40.779 km^{2}. Within the bounds of the community is the site of the ancient town of Ericinium.

== Economy ==
The population of Megalo Eleftherochori is occupied in animal husbandry and agriculture (mainly tobacco).

== Population ==
Historical population
Year	Pop.	±%
2001	751	—
2011	584	−22.2%
2021	435	−25.5%

== See also ==
- List of settlements in the Larissa regional unit
