= Spilia =

Spilia (Greek meaning "cave") may refer to the following places:

== Greece ==
- Spilia, Cephalonia, a village in Cephalonia
- Spilia, Chania, a village in the Chania regional unit
- Spilia, Heraklion, a village in the Heraklion regional unit
- Spilia, Kastoria, a village in the Kastoria regional unit
- Spilia, Kozani, a village in the Kozani regional unit
- Spilia, Larissa, a village in the Larissa regional unit
- Spilia, Messenia, a village in Messenia
- Spilia, Phocis, a village in Phocis

== Cyprus ==
- Spilia, Cyprus, a village
