= Magoula (disambiguation) =

Magoula (Greek: Μαγούλα) may refer to several places in Greece:

- Magoula, Attica, a western suburb of Athens north of Elefsina
- Magoula, a subdivision of Sparta in Laconia
- Magoula, Larissa, a village and a community in Elassona
- Skete of Magoula, a former Greek Orthodox Christian skete near Philotheou Monastery, Mount Athos
