= Mesochori =

Mesochori (Greek: Μεσοχώρι, Greek pronunciation: [meso'xoɾi])) may refer to several settlements in Greece:

- Mesochori, Anatoliki Mani, a village in East Mani
- Mesochori, Drama, a village in Paranesti
- Mesochori, Evrytania, a village in Karpenisi
- Mesochori, Florina, a village and a community in Florina
- Mesochori, Heraklion, a village and a community in Archanes-Asterousia
- Mesochori, Karpathos, a village and a community in Karpathos
- Mesochori, Larissa, a village and a community in Elassona
- Mesochori, Messenia, a village and a community in Pylos-Nestor
- Mesochori, Monemvasia, a village and a community in Monemvasia
- Mesochori, Phthiotis, a village and a community in Lamia
- Mesochori, Rhodope, a village in Komotini
