= Amouri, Larissa =

Amouri Αμούρι
- Community
- Location within Greece
- Coordinates: 39°47′N 22°5.4′E
- Country: Greece
- Administrative region: Thessaly
- Regional unit: Larissa
- Municipality: Elassona
- Municipal unit: Potamia

Area
  - Community: 7.328 km^{2} (2.829 sq mi)
- Elevation: 170 m (560 ft)

Population (2021)
  - Community: 248
  - Density: 33.8/km^{2} (87.7/sq mi)
- Time zone: UTC+2 (EET)
  - Summer (DST): UTC+3 (EEST)
- Postal code: 402 00
- Area code: +30-2493
- Vehicle registration: PI

Amouri (Greek: Αμούρι, Greek pronunciation: [a'muɾi]) is a village and a community of the Elassona municipality. Before the 2011 local government reform, it was a part of the municipality of Potamia, of which it was a municipal district. The community of Amouri covers an area of 7.328 km^{2}.

== Economy ==
The population of Amouri is occupied in animal husbandry and agriculture (mainly tobacco, grain and other cereals).

== Population ==
Historical population
Year	Pop.	±%
2001	398	—
2011	312	−21.6%
2021	248	−20.5%

== See also ==
- List of settlements in the Larissa regional unit
