= Elateia, Larissa =

Populated place in Greece

Elateia Ελάτεια
- Community
- Location within Greece
- Coordinates: 39°48′40″N 22°32′17″E
- Country: Greece
- Administrative region: Thessaly
- Regional unit: Larissa
- Municipality: Tempi
- Municipal unit: Makrychori

Population (2021)
  - Community: 407
- Time zone: UTC+2 (EET)
  - Summer (DST): UTC+3 (EEST)

Elateia (Greek: Ελάτεια) is a settlement of the municipal unit of Makrychori, which belongs to the municipality of Tempi in the Larissa regional unit, Thessaly, Greece.

The Museum of Thessalian Life (Μουσείο Θεσσαλικής Ζωής), is a simulation of an edifice of the Traditional Agricultural Activities and gives the chance to people, to live the experience of the past time.
