= Parapotamos, Larissa =

Parapotamos Παραπόταμος
- Community
- Location within Greece
- Coordinates: 39°49′48″N 22°28′01″E
- Country: Greece
- Administrative region: Thessaly
- Regional unit: Larissa
- Municipality: Tempi
- Municipal unit: Makrychori

Population (2021)
  - Community: 202
- Time zone: UTC+2 (EET)
  - Summer (DST): UTC+3 (EEST)

Parapotamos (Greek: Παραπόταμος) is a settlement of the municipal unit of Makrychori, which is part of the municipality of Tempi, northern Greece. It is situated on the right bank of the river Pineios. The people of the area are mostly farmers and the settlement is famous for its olive production.
