= Pretori =

Pretori may refer to:

- Praitori, Cyprus
- Praitori, Larissa, Greece, known as Pretori in Romanian
