= Eleftheres, Larissa =

Eleftheres Ελευθερές
- Community
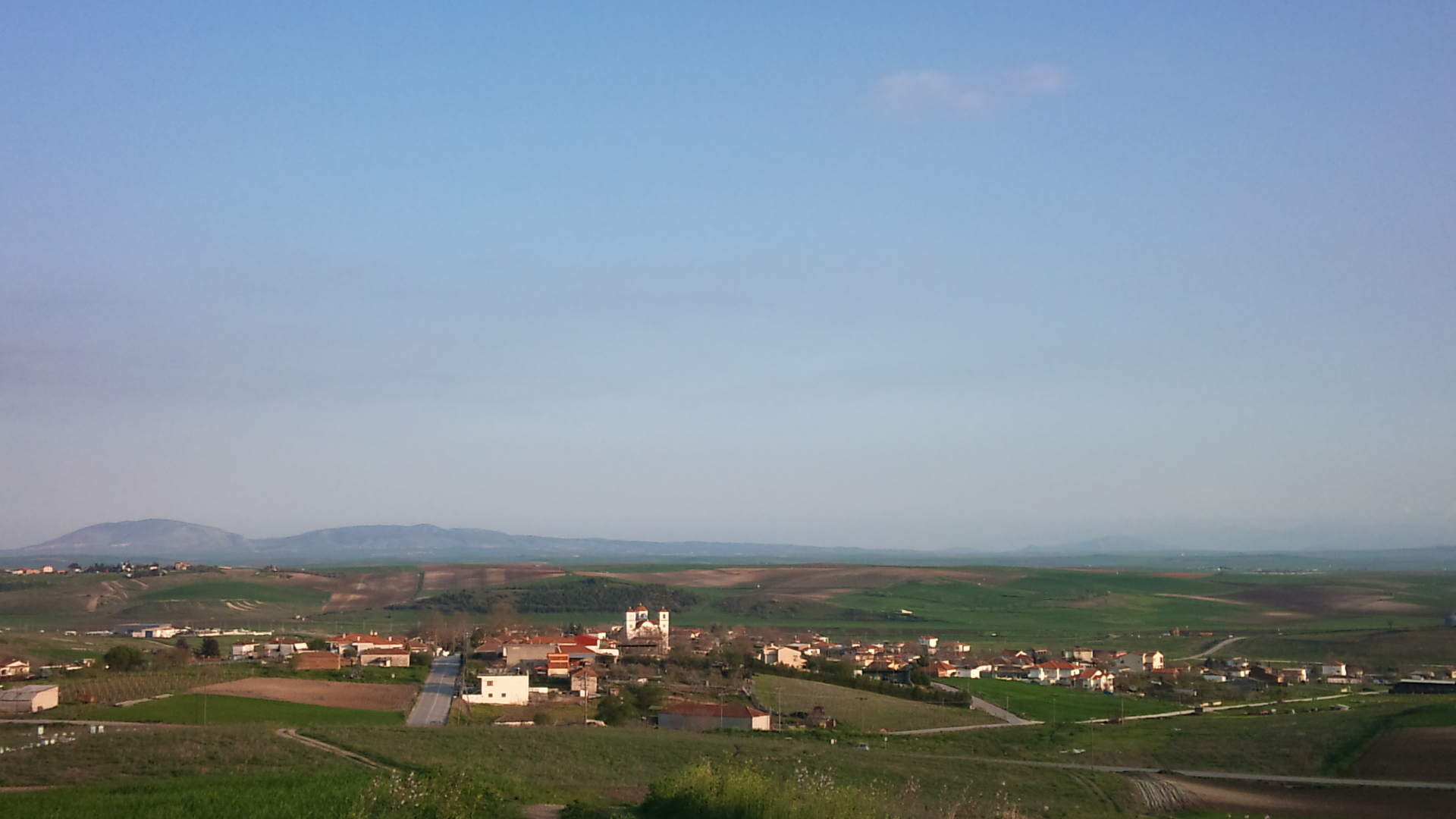

- Location within Greece
- Coordinates: 39°34′N 22°20′E
- Country: Greece
- Administrative region: Thessaly
- Regional unit: Larissa
- Municipality: Larissa
- Municipal unit: Koilada
- Elevation: 110 m (360 ft)

Population (2021)
  - Community: 358
- Time zone: UTC+2 (EET)
  - Summer (DST): UTC+3 (EEST)
- Postal code: 41500
- Area code: 2410

Eleftheres (Greek: Ελευθερές) is a Greek village in Larissa. It is located at a distance of 11 km from the city of Larissa, bordering villages Koilada, Terpsithea and Mesorachi. It lies at an altitude of 110 meters.

== Name ==
The village is also called Eleftherai (in Katharevousa).

== History ==
Remains of the Neolithic and Classical period were found in the hilly area southwest of the village.

== People ==
The main occupation of the villagers is agriculture and livestock. In recent years Eleftheres has seen residential development.

Historical population
Year	Pop.	±%
2001	410	—
2011	520	+26.8%
2021	358	−31.2%

== Religious fairs ==
At the religious fair in memory of Saint Charalampos (10/2) people have the opportunity to taste traditional boiled rice, snacks and local wine. There are also two other religious fairs in memory of Cosmas of Aetolia (24/8) and St. Bessarion.

== Photographic material ==
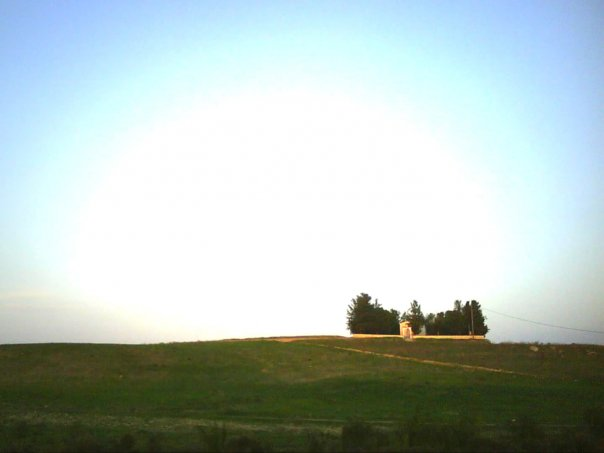
Saint Charalampos chapel in Eleftheres

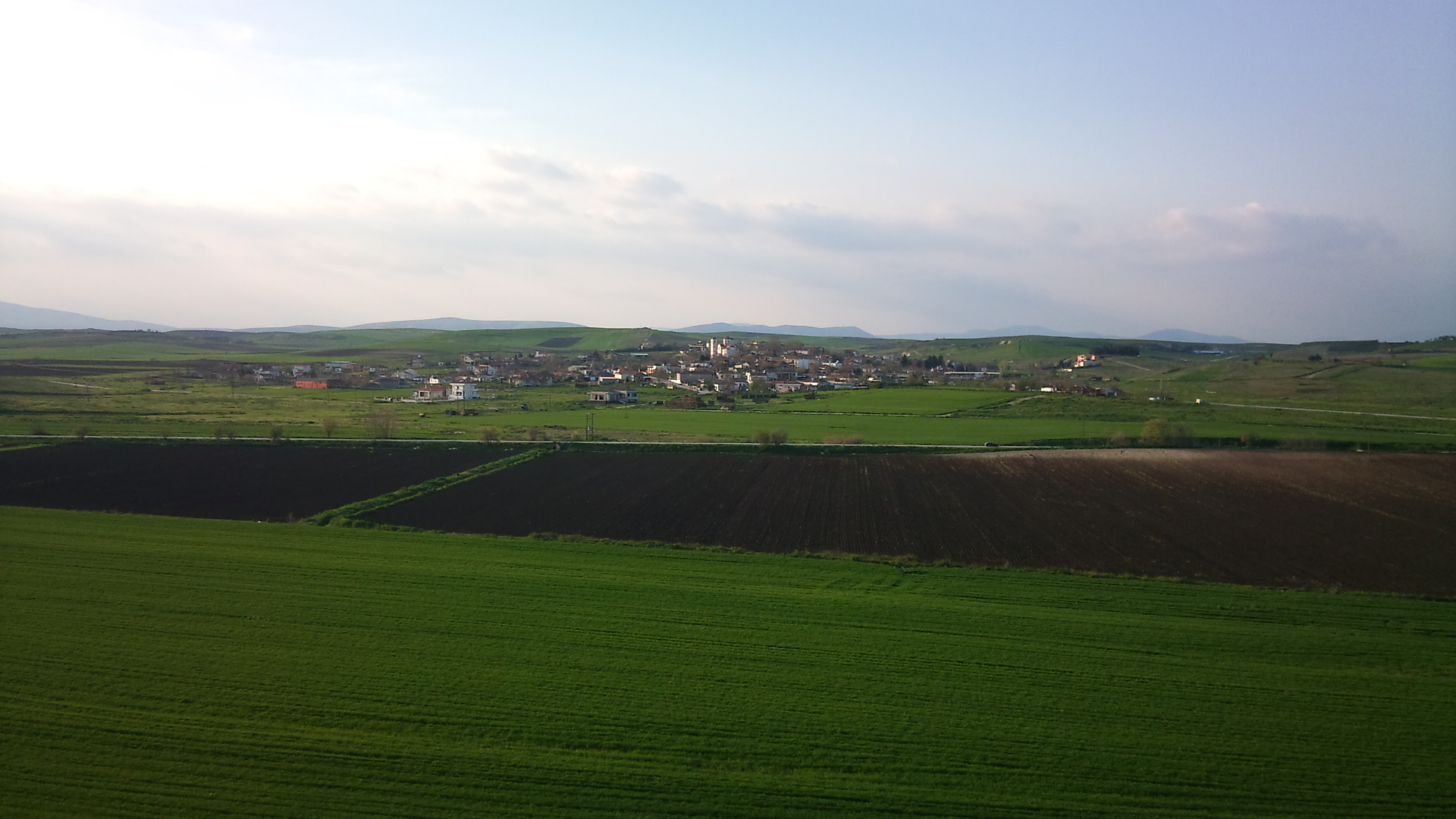
Viem from Rizo Hill

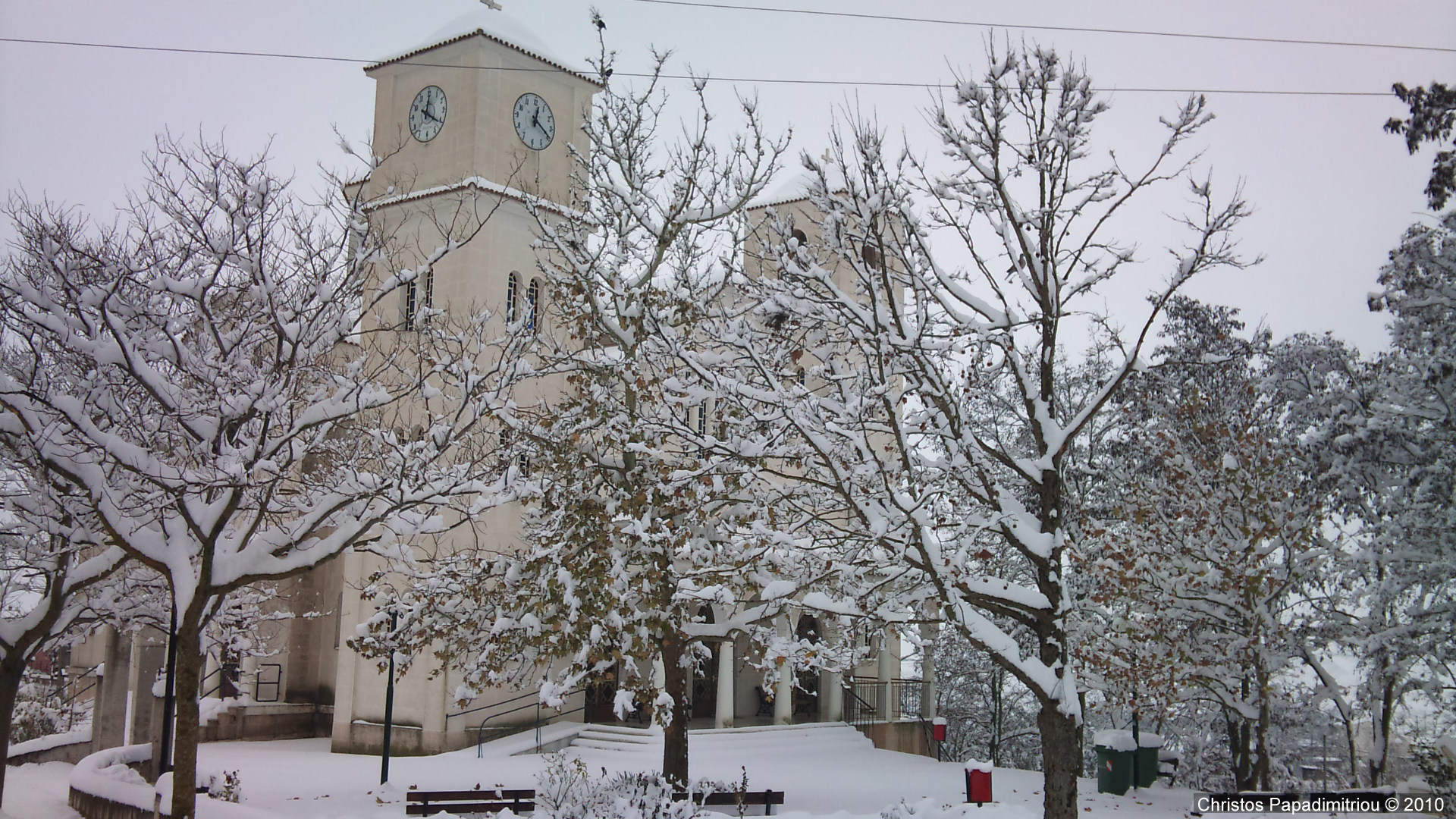
The Church of Cosmas of Aetolia

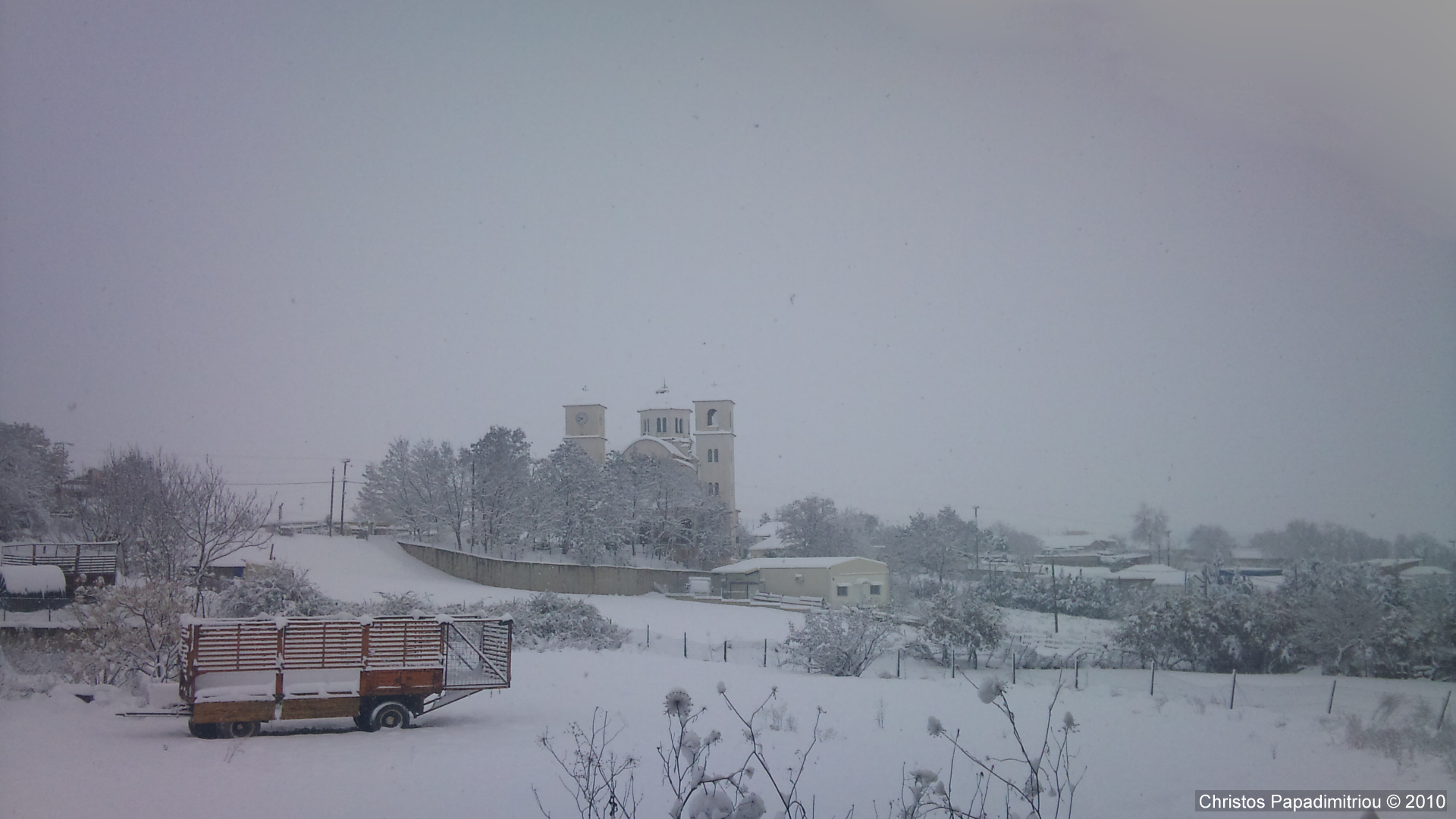
Eleftheres during December 2010)

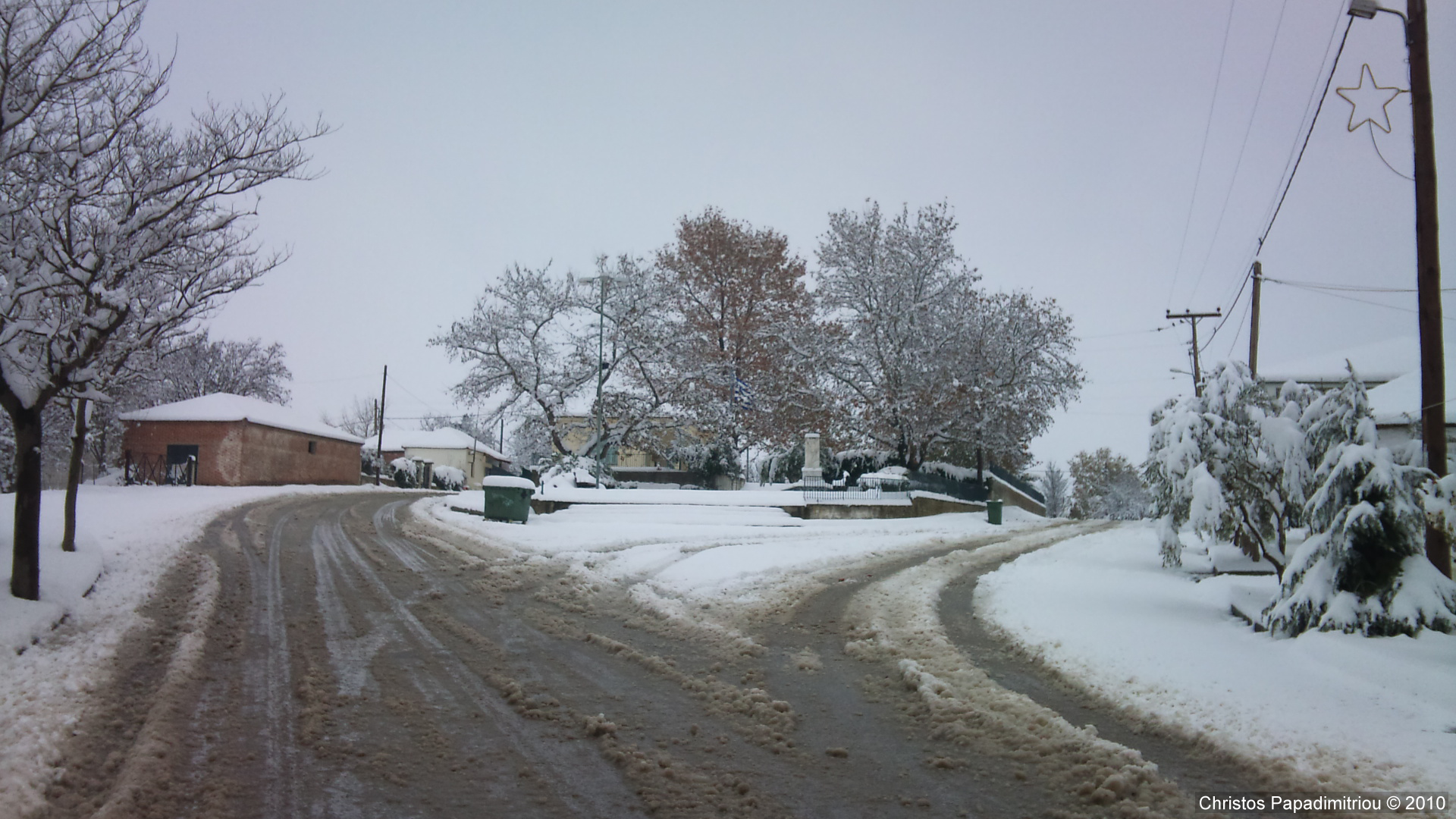
View of village square
