= Amouri =

Amouri may refer to:

- Amouri, Larissa, Greece
- Amouri, Pthiotis, Greece
