= Vlachogianni =

Vlachogianni Βλαχογιάννι
- Community
- Location within Greece
- Coordinates: 39°44.5′N 22°5.3′E
- Country: Greece
- Administrative region: Thessaly
- Regional unit: Larissa
- Municipality: Elassona
- Municipal unit: Potamia

Area
  - Community: 33.974 km^{2} (13.117 sq mi)
- Elevation: 150 m (490 ft)

Population (2021)
  - Community: 684
  - Density: 20.1/km^{2} (52.1/sq mi)
- Time zone: UTC+2 (EET)
  - Summer (DST): UTC+3 (EEST)
- Postal code: 401 00
- Area code: +30-2492
- Vehicle registration: PI

Vlachogianni (Greek: Βλαχογιάννι, Greek pronunciation: [vlaxo'ʝani]) is a village and a community of the Elassona municipality, in Greece. Before the 2011 local government reform it was a part of the municipality of Potamia, of which it was a municipal district and the seat. The community of Vlachogianni covers an area of 33.974 km^{2}.

== History ==
In the Ottoman tahrir defteri (number 101) of 1521, the settlement is recorded as a village with the name İvlahoyan. In 1531, Vlachogianni is mentioned in an Ottoman bey's will. In the end of the 16th century the main occupation of the people's residents was the cultivation of Cannabis sativa. In the beginning of the 19th century the village became a chiflik of Ali Pasha.

In the early 1900s, Vlachogianni was being used as a winter residence by semi-nomadic Aromanians; they were Farsherots, and Pindeans from certain villages in the region of Grevena. Between 1913 and 1914, there were 268 Aromanians that were wintering in Vlachogianni, out of a total population of 689 residents.

== Economy ==
The population of Vlachogianni is occupied in animal husbandry and agriculture (mainly tobacco).

== Population ==
Historical population
Year	Pop.	±%
2001	891	—
2011	895	+0.4%
2021	684	−23.6%

== See also ==
- List of settlements in the Larissa regional unit
