= Krania, Elassona =

Krania Κρανιά
- Community
- Location within Greece
- Coordinates: 39°57.1′N 21°58.2′E
- Country: Greece
- Administrative region: Thessaly
- Regional unit: Larissa
- Municipality: Elassona
- Municipal unit: Elassona

Area
  - Community: 94.258 km^{2} (36.393 sq mi)
- Elevation: 760 m (2,490 ft)

Population (2021)
  - Community: 1,346
  - Density: 14.28/km^{2} (36.98/sq mi)
- Time zone: UTC+2 (EET)
  - Summer (DST): UTC+3 (EEST)
- Postal code: 402 00
- Area code: +30-2493
- Vehicle registration: PI

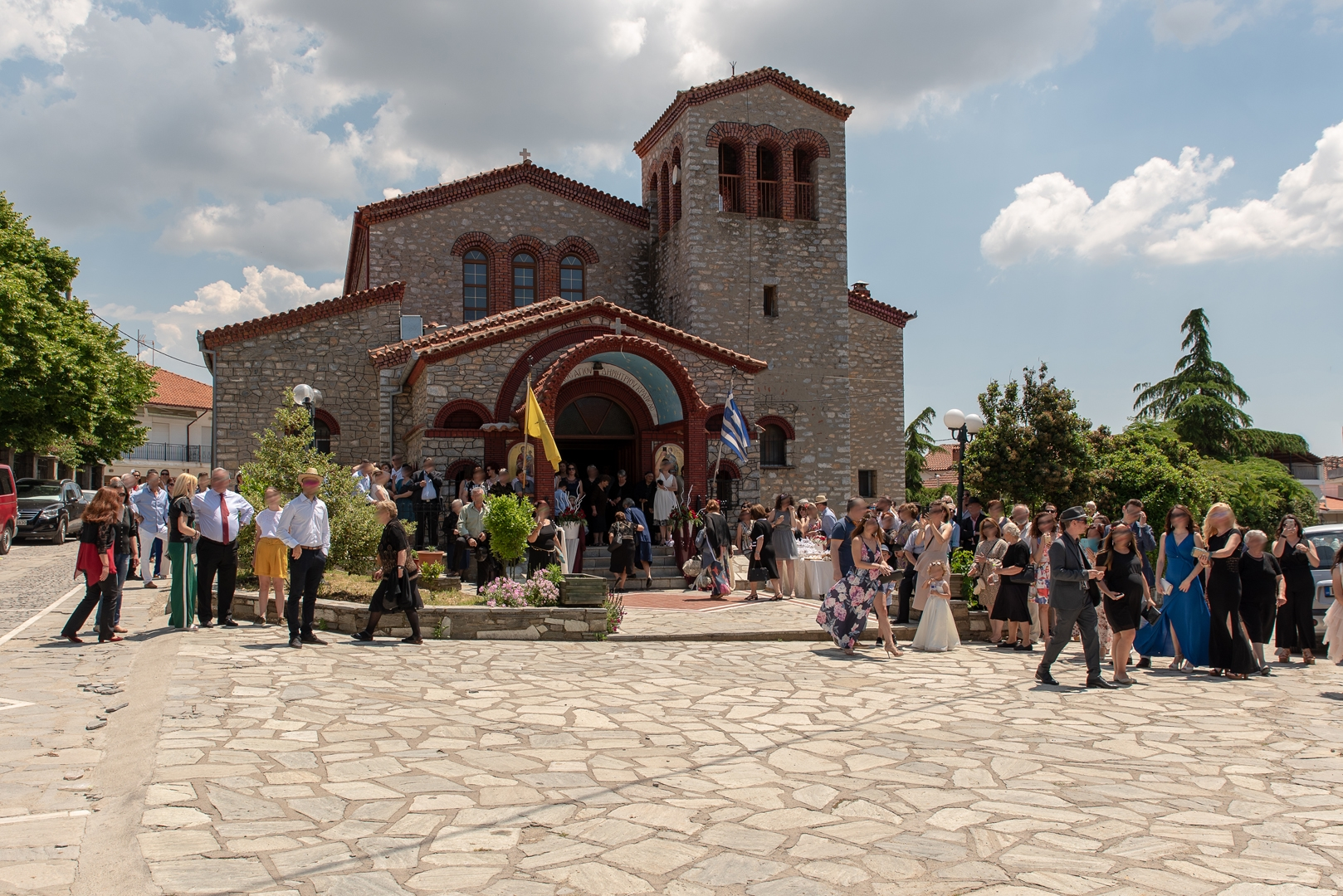
Church of Agios Dimitrios, Krania

Krania (Greek: Κρανιά, Greek pronunciation: [kɾa'ɲa]) is a village and a community of the Elassona municipality. Before the 2011 local government reform it was part of the municipality of Antichasia, of which it was a municipal district and the seat. The community of Krania covers an area of 94.258 km^{2}.

Aromanian is spoken in this village. The Aromanian dialect of Krania is one of the few with differential object marking (DOM) together with those dialects spoken at the west of Ohrid in North Macedonia.

== Population ==
Historical population
Year	Pop.	±%
2001	2,686	—
2011	2,691	+0.2%
2021	1,346	−50.0%

== See also ==
- List of settlements in the Larissa regional unit
