= Magoula, Larissa =

Magoula Μαγούλα
- Community
- Location within Greece
- Coordinates: 39°48.8′N 22°4.8′E
- Country: Greece
- Administrative region: Thessaly
- Regional unit: Larissa
- Municipality: Elassona
- Municipal unit: Potamia

Area
  - Community: 7.803 km^{2} (3.013 sq mi)
- Elevation: 180 m (590 ft)

Population (2021)
  - Community: 178
  - Density: 22.8/km^{2} (59.1/sq mi)
- Time zone: UTC+2 (EET)
  - Summer (DST): UTC+3 (EEST)
- Postal code: 402 00
- Area code: +30-2493
- Vehicle registration: PI

Magoula (Greek: Μαγούλα, Greek pronunciation: [ma'ɣula]) is a village and a community of the Elassona municipality. Before the 2011 local government reform it was a part of the municipality of Potamia, of which it was a municipal district. The community of Magoula covers an area of 7.803 km^{2}.

== Economy ==
The population of Magoula is occupied in animal husbandry and agriculture (mainly tobacco).

== Population ==
Historical population
Year	Pop.	±%
2001	346	—
2011	232	−32.9%
2021	178	−23.3%

== See also ==
- List of settlements in the Larissa regional unit
