= Praitori, Larissa =

Praitori Πραιτώρι
- Community
- Location within Greece
- Coordinates: 39°47.5′N 22°3.9′E
- Country: Greece
- Administrative region: Thessaly
- Regional unit: Larissa
- Municipality: Elassona
- Municipal unit: Potamia

Area
  - Community: 14.957 km^{2} (5.775 sq mi)
- Elevation: 175 m (574 ft)

Population (2021)
  - Community: 301
  - Density: 20.1/km^{2} (52.1/sq mi)
- Time zone: UTC+2 (EET)
  - Summer (DST): UTC+3 (EEST)
- Postal code: 402 00
- Area code: +30-2493
- Vehicle registration: PI

Praitori (Greek: Πραιτώρι, Greek pronunciation: [pɾe'toɾi]) is a village and a community of the Elassona municipality. Before the 2011 local government reform it was a part of the municipality of Potamia, of which it was a municipal district. The community of Praitori covers an area of 14.957 km^{2}.

== History ==
The settlement is recorded as village under the name "Pritor" in an Ottoman Defter of 1521. In the 19th century the village became a chiflik of Ali Pasha.

== Economy ==
The population of Praitori is occupied in animal husbandry and agriculture (mainly tobacco and grain).

== Population ==
Historical population
Year	Pop.	±%
2001	421	—
2011	362	−14.0%
2021	301	−16.9%

== See also ==
- List of settlements in the Larissa regional unit
