= Spilia, Larissa =

Spilia Σπηλιά
- Community
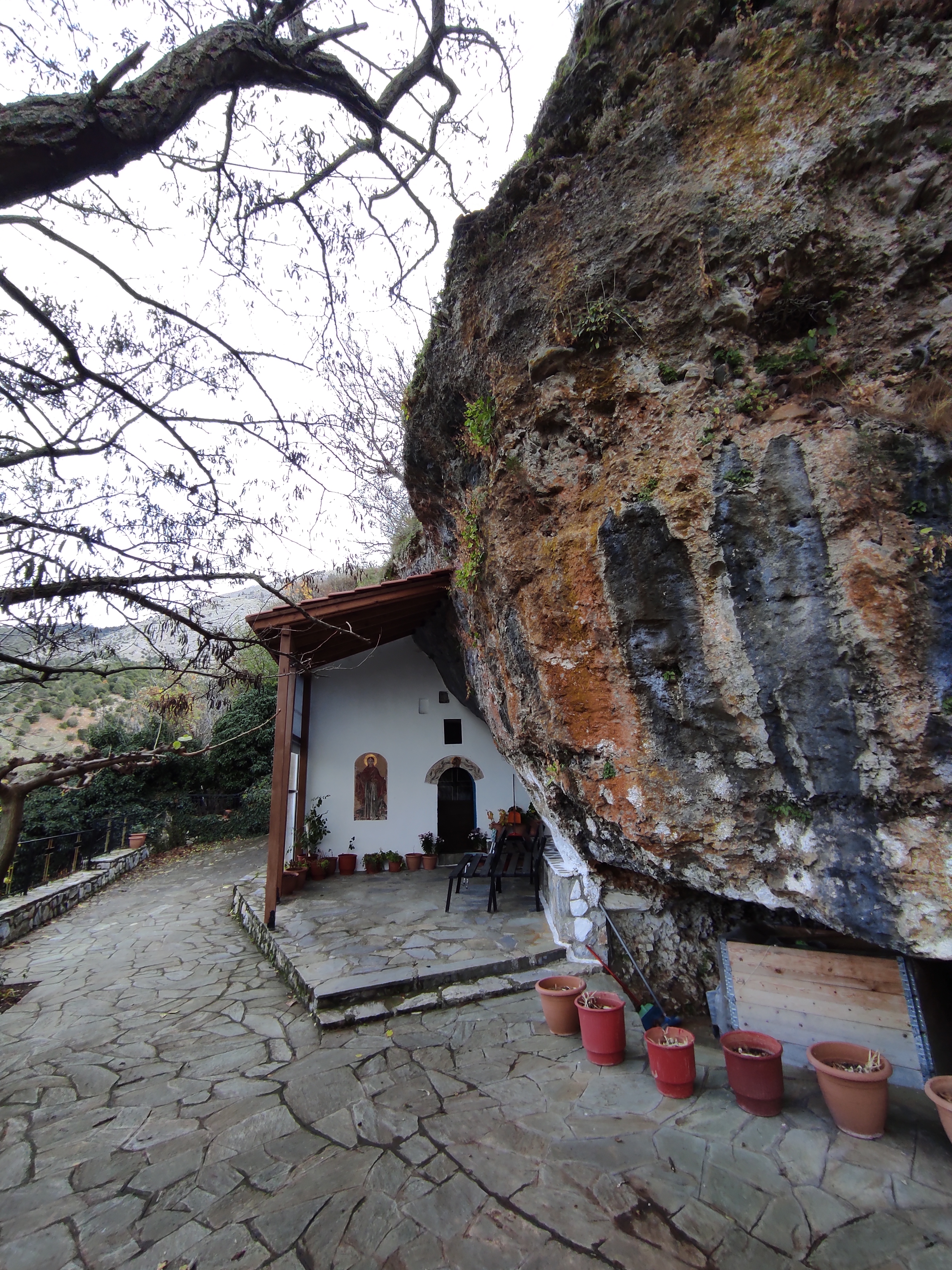
- Our Lady of the Rock, Ossa Cave

- Location within Greece
- Coordinates: 39°47′49″N 22°38′46″E
- Country: Greece
- Administrative region: Thessaly
- Regional unit: Larissa
- Municipality: Tempi
- Municipal unit: Nessonas

Population (2021)
  - Community: 252
- Time zone: UTC+2 (EET)
  - Summer (DST): UTC+3 (EEST)

Spiliá (Greek: Σπηλιά Λάρισας) is a settlement of the former municipality of Nessonas, which is part of the municipality of Tempi in the Larissa regional unit, Thessaly, Greece. It has 370 inhabitants (2011). Spilia is built on Mount Kissavos at 850 meter altitude, 30 km from Larissa.

The people of Spilia are engaged in agriculture, farming and tourism. Southwest of the settlement, has identified many vaulted Mycenaean tombs.
