= Mesochori, Larissa =

Village in Thessaly, Greece

Mesochori Μεσοχώρι
- Community
- Location within Greece
- Coordinates: 39°44.9′N 22°6.2′E
- Country: Greece
- Administrative region: Thessaly
- Regional unit: Larissa
- Municipality: Elassona
- Municipal unit: Potamia

Area
  - Community: 31.721 km^{2} (12.248 sq mi)
- Elevation: 150 m (490 ft)

Population (2021)
  - Community: 414
  - Density: 13.1/km^{2} (33.8/sq mi)
- Time zone: UTC+2 (EET)
  - Summer (DST): UTC+3 (EEST)
- Postal code: 401 00
- Area code: +30-2492
- Vehicle registration: PI

Mesochori (Greek: Μεσοχώρι, Greek pronunciation: [meso'xoɾi]) is a village in the Thessaly region of Greece. Administratively, it is a community of the municipality of Elassona, while before the 2011 local government reform it was a part of the municipality of Potamia, of which it was a municipal district. The community of Mesochori covers an area of 31.721 km^{2}.

== Economy ==
The population of Mesochori is occupied in animal husbandry and agriculture (mainly tobacco).

== Population ==
Historical population
Year	Pop.	±%
2001	557	—
2011	551	−1.1%
2021	414	−24.9%

== See also ==
- List of settlements in the Larissa regional unit
