= Namata, Larissa =

Namata Νάματα
- Community
- Location within Greece
- Coordinates: 39°37′N 22°37′E
- Country: Greece
- Administrative region: Thessaly
- Regional unit: Larissa
- Municipality: Kileler
- Municipal unit: Platykampos

Population (2021)
  - Community: 94
- Time zone: UTC+2 (EET)
  - Summer (DST): UTC+3 (EEST)
- Vehicle registration: ΡΙ

Namata (Greek: Νάματα) is a village in the municipal unit of Platykampos, Larissa regional unit, Greece. Namata is located about 20 km east of Larissa, in the Thessalian plains.

== Population ==
Historical population
Year	Pop.	±%
1981	167	—
1991	160	−4.2%
2001	131	−18.1%
2011	105	−19.8%
2021	94	−10.5%

== History ==
Namata was liberated by the Greeks in 1880 and joined the rest of the country in 1881 ending the Ottoman rule of much of Thessaly. The origin of the name comes from the Ancient Greek word nama (νάμα) which means clean water.
