= Nikaia, Larissa =

Town in Thessaly, Greece

Nikaia Νίκαια
- Municipal unit
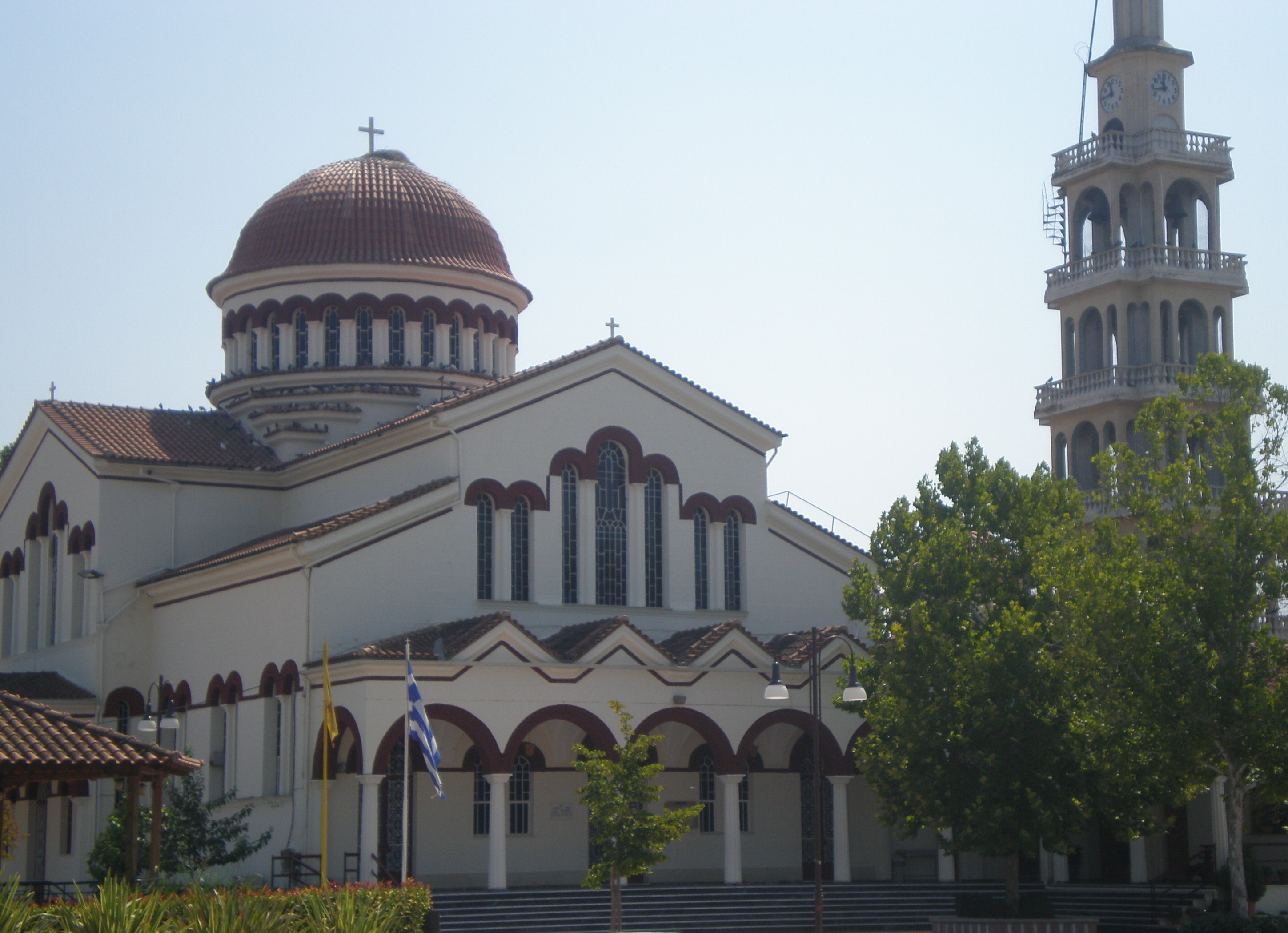
- Church of Saint George

- Location within the regional unit

- Location within Greece
- Coordinates: 39°34′N 22°28′E
- Country: Greece
- Administrative region: Thessaly
- Regional unit: Larissa
- Municipality: Kileler

Area
  - Municipal unit: 279.562 km^{2} (107.939 sq mi)
  - Community: 60.529 km^{2} (23.370 sq mi)

Population (2021)
  - Municipal unit: 5,436
  - Municipal unit density: 19.44/km^{2} (50.36/sq mi)
  - Community: 3,332
  - Community density: 55.05/km^{2} (142.6/sq mi)
- Time zone: UTC+2 (EET)
  - Summer (DST): UTC+3 (EEST)
- Vehicle registration: ΡΙ

Nikaia (Greek: Νίκαια) is a town and a former municipality in the Larissa regional unit, Thessaly, Greece. Located 4 km south of Larissa city, it forms a part of Larissa's metropolitan area, that lies in the Thessalian plain. Since the 2011 local government reform, it has been part of the municipality Kileler, of which it is the seat and a municipal unit. The population is 5,436 (2021). The municipal unit has an area of 279.562 km^{2}.
