= Makrychori =

Makrychori Μακρυχώρι
- Municipal unit
- Location within the regional unit

- Location within Greece
- Coordinates: 39°48′N 22°29′E
- Country: Greece
- Administrative region: Thessaly
- Regional unit: Larissa
- Municipality: Tempi
- Districts: 4

Area
  - Municipal unit: 107.767 km^{2} (41.609 sq mi)
- Elevation: 108 m (354 ft)

Population (2021)
  - Municipal unit: 2,379
  - Municipal unit density: 22.08/km^{2} (57.18/sq mi)
  - Community: 1,663
- Time zone: UTC+2 (EET)
  - Summer (DST): UTC+3 (EEST)
- Postal code: 40 009
- Vehicle registration: ΡΙ

Makrychori (Greek: Μακρυχώρι, Katharevousa: Μακρυχώριον) is a former municipality in the Larissa regional unit, Thessaly, Greece. Since the 2011 local government reform it has been part of the municipality Tempi, of which it is a municipal unit. The municipal unit has an area of 107.767 km^{2}. The municipality was created under the Kapodistrias Law in 1997 out of the former communes of Elateia, Evangelismos, Gyrtoni and Parapotamos.

== Subdivisions ==
The municipal unit Makrychori is subdivided into the following communities (constituent villages in brackets):

- Elateia
- Evangelismos
- Makrychori (Makrychori, Gyrtoni)
- Parapotamos

== Population ==
Year	Municipal unit population	Community population	Village population
1991	-	-	1,941
1991	3,004	-	1,666
2001	2,976	1,863	1,787
2011	2,553	1,689	1,615
2021	2,379	1,663	1,591

== Geography ==
Makrychori is located next to the Thessalian Plain, situated between the river Pineios and the Athens–Thessaloniki transport corridor carrying the EO1 road, the A1 motorway and the Piraeus–Platy railway. The mountains can be seen to the west and east, the southern portions of the municipality are farmlands.
