= Tsaritsani =

Tsaritsani Τσαριτσάνη
- Municipal unit
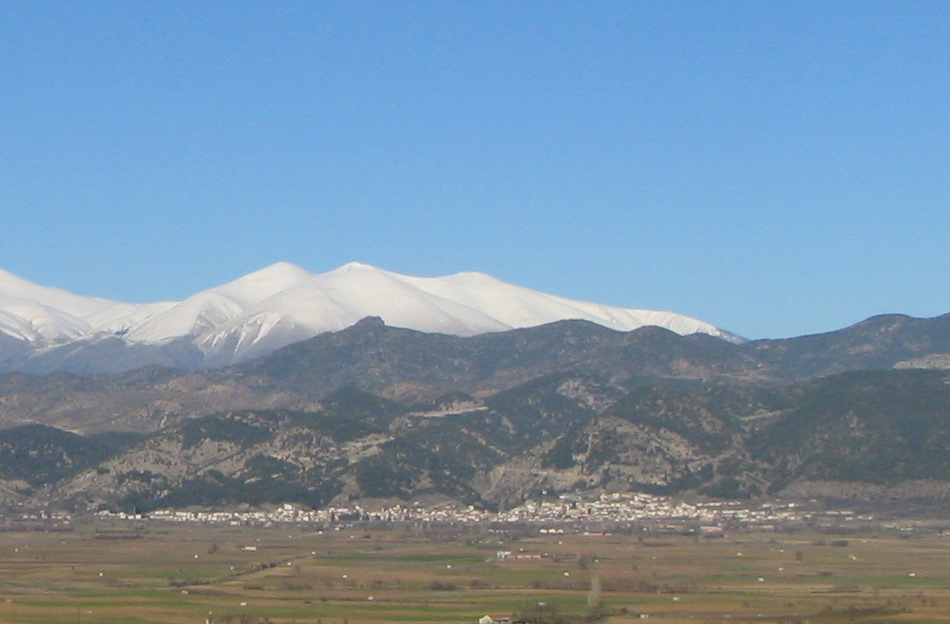
- A view of Tsaritsani with Mount Olympus in the background.

- Location within the regional unit

- Location within Greece
- Coordinates: 39°52.9′N 22°13.7′E
- Country: Greece
- Administrative region: Thessaly
- Regional unit: Larissa
- Municipality: Elassona

Area
  - Municipal unit: 57.791 km^{2} (22.313 sq mi)
- Elevation: 320 m (1,050 ft)

Population (2021)
  - Municipal unit: 1,519
  - Municipal unit density: 26.28/km^{2} (68.08/sq mi)
- Time zone: UTC+2 (EET)
  - Summer (DST): UTC+3 (EEST)
- Postal code: 402 00
- Area code: +30-2493
- Vehicle registration: PI

Tsaritsani (Greek: Τσαριτσάνη [t͡saɾiˈt͡sani]) or Tsiaritsiani (local Greek: Τσιαρίτσιανη [t͡ʃaˈɾit͡ʃani]) is a village and a community of the Elassona municipality. Before the 2011 local government reform, it was an independent community. The community of Tsaritsani covers an area of 57.791 km^{2}.

== Population ==
Historical population
Year	Pop.	±%
2001	2,321	—
2011	2,040	−12.1%
2021	1,519	−25.5%

== Geography ==
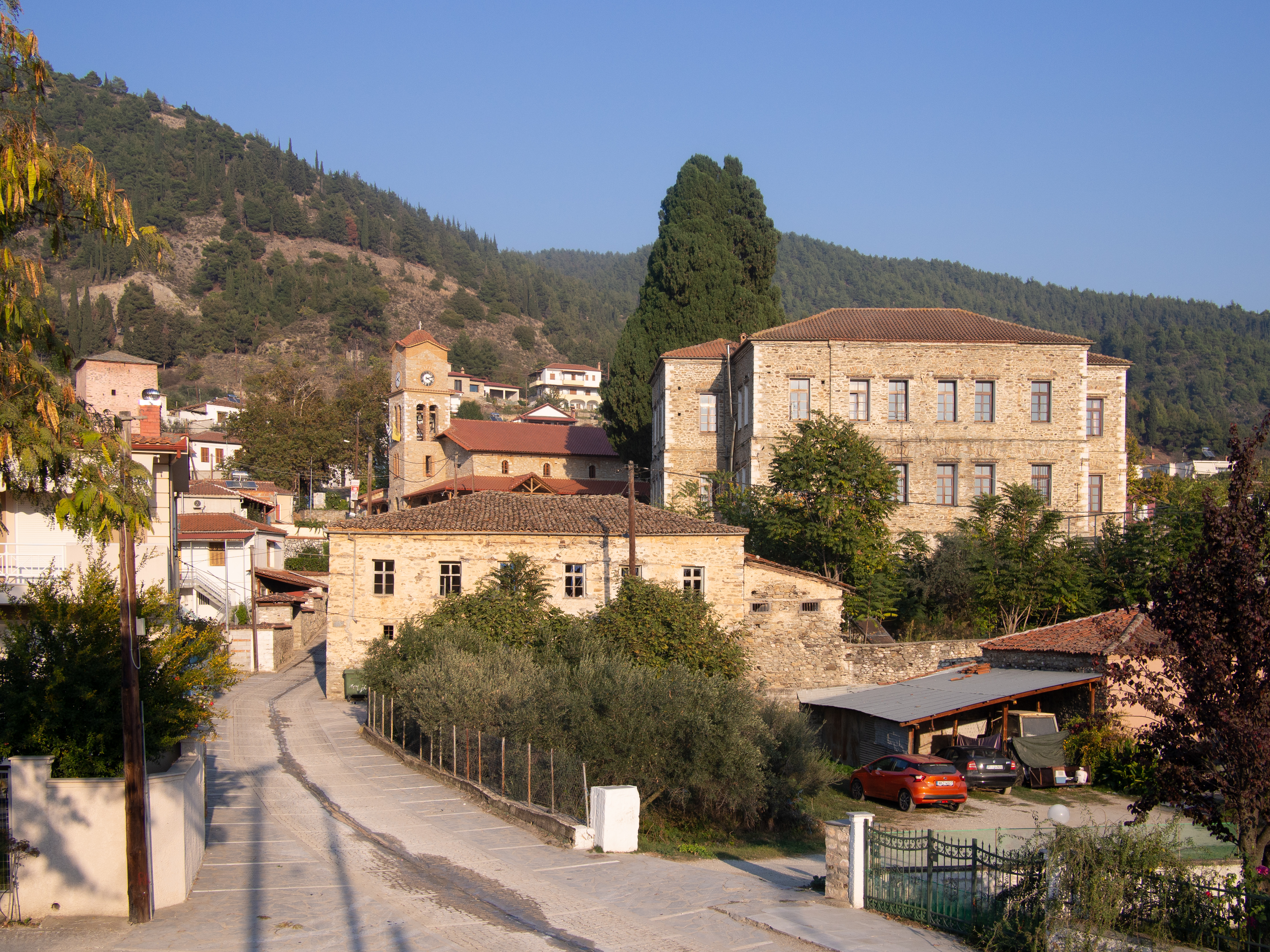
Street

Tsaritsani lies in the northwestern part of Larissa regional unit, 40 km from Larissa, at the foot of Mount Olympus. It has a land area of 57.791 km^{2}. Its geography includes farmlands in the valley areas, the mountains are around the area as well as grasslands, ledges are to be founded in some areas and barren area in the higher elevations.

== Economy ==
The population of Tsaritsani is occupied in animal husbandry, agriculture (mainly grain, vegetables and tobacco) and winery.

== History ==
The name of Tsaritsani is of Slavic origin, most likely from Tsar or Tsaritsa. The history of Tsaritsani starts with the Slavic settlement of Greece in the seventh century AD. The settlement is recorded as a village and with two names first as "Kiliseli" and as "Çerniçani" in the Ottoman Tahrir Defter number 101 dating to 1521. The village participated in the Greek War of Independence and offered fighters to the Sacred Band.

The first guerilla groups of the Greek People's Liberation Army in the area were created from residents of Tsaritsani. The village is the ancestral home of popular wartime singer Sofia Vembo. The village witnessed mass execution of its people twice, on 12 March 1943 and on 20 August 1944 by the Italian and German occupation forces respectively. As a result, Tsaritsani is a stronghold of the left.

In the European Parliament elections of 2014 the Communist Party of Greece received a 30.83% share of the vote in the village, when its nationwide share was 6.11%.

== Sports ==
Tsaritsani is home to Oikonomos Tsaritsani, a football club that has competed in the third tier of Greek football. Greek international footballer Giorgos Mitsibonas, a Tsaritsani native, started his career from the club.

== See also ==
- List of settlements in the Larissa regional unit
