= Krannonas =

Krannonas Κραννώνας
- Municipal unit
- Location within the regional unit

- Location within Greece
- Coordinates: 39°31′N 22°21′E
- Country: Greece
- Administrative region: Thessaly
- Regional unit: Larissa
- Municipality: Kileler

Area
  - Municipal unit: 205.24 km^{2} (79.24 sq mi)
  - Community: 22.286 km^{2} (8.605 sq mi)
- Elevation: 120 m (390 ft)

Population (2021)
  - Municipal unit: 2,007
  - Municipal unit density: 9.779/km^{2} (25.33/sq mi)
  - Community: 127
  - Community density: 5.70/km^{2} (14.8/sq mi)
- Time zone: UTC+2 (EET)
  - Summer (DST): UTC+3 (EEST)
- Vehicle registration: ΡΙ

Krannonas (Greek: Κραννώνας) is a village and a former municipality in the Larissa regional unit, Thessaly, Greece. Since the 2011 local government reform it is part of the municipality Kileler, of which it is a municipal unit. It is located southwest of the regional capital Larissa. In 2021 its population was 127 for the community and 2,007 for the municipal unit. The municipal unit has an area of 205.242 km^{2}. The seat of the municipality was Agioi Anargyroi. It is located north of Farsala and NNE of Palamas and Karditsa.

The municipal unit boundaries extend as far south as the Fyllio Mountains where its highest point is 533 m, as far north as Koilada and Larissa and as far east as Nikaia. In the west it borders the Karditsa regional unit.

In the territory of Krannonas, at a place called Palealarissa, is the site of the ancient city of Crannon, the site of the decisive battle of the Lamian War between Macedon and Athens with its allies.

== Subdivisions ==
The municipal unit Krannonas is subdivided into the following communities (constituent villages in brackets):

- Agioi Anargyroi (Agioi Anargyroi, Mesorrachi)
- Agios Georgios
- Doxaras
- Krannonas (Krannonas, Kampos)
- Kyparissos (Kyparissos, Agia Paraskevi)
- Mavrovouni (Mavrovouni, Krya Vrysi)
- Mikro Vouno
- Psychiko
- Vounaina (Vounaina, Ano Vounaina)
