= Ericinium =

Town and polis (city-state) of Perrhaebia in ancient Thessaly

Coordinates: 39°41′24″N 22°04′40″E

Map showing ancient Thessaly. Ericinium is shown to the northwest of centre.

Ericinium or Ereikinion (Ancient Greek: Ἐρεικίνιον) was a town and polis (city-state) of Perrhaebia in ancient Thessaly, situated near the frontiers of Histiaeotis.

The existence of the town is attested by epigraphic evidence at least since the 4th century BCE. In the Roman-Seleucid War, in the year 191 BCE, it was taken from the Athamanians by the joint army commanded by the Roman Marcus Baebius Tamphilus and Philip V of Macedon.

Its location has been found at the modern village of Megalo Eleftherochori.
