= Antichasia, Greece =

Antichasia Αντιχάσια
- Municipal unit
- Location within the regional unit

- Location within Greece
- Coordinates: 39°57′N 21°58′E
- Country: Greece
- Administrative region: Thessaly
- Regional unit: Larissa
- Municipality: Elassona

Area
  - Municipal unit: 142.919 km^{2} (55.181 sq mi)
- Elevation: 767 m (2,516 ft)

Population (2021)
  - Municipal unit: 1,928
  - Municipal unit density: 13.49/km^{2} (34.94/sq mi)
- Time zone: UTC+2 (EET)
  - Summer (DST): UTC+3 (EEST)
- Postal code: 402 00
- Area code: +30-2493
- Vehicle registration: PI

Antichasia (Greek: Αντιχάσια, Greek pronunciation: [adi'xasça]) is a municipal unit of the Elassona municipality. Before the 2011 local government reform it was an independent municipality. The seat of the municipality was in Krania. The municipal unit covers an area of 142.919 km^{2}. Its name comes from the nearby Antichasia mountain.

== Population ==
Historical population
| Year | Pop. | ±% |
|---|---|---|
| 2001 | 3,548 | — |
| 2011 | 3,584 | +1.0% |
| 2021 | 1,928 | −46.2% |

== See also ==
- List of settlements in the Larissa regional unit
