= Narthaki =

Narthaki Ναρθάκι
- Municipal unit
- Location within the regional unit

- Location within Greece
- Coordinates: 39°14′N 22°29′E
- Country: Greece
- Administrative region: Thessaly
- Regional unit: Larissa
- Municipality: Farsala

Area
  - Municipal unit: 164.1 km^{2} (63.4 sq mi)

Population (2021)
  - Municipal unit: 989
  - Municipal unit density: 6.03/km^{2} (15.6/sq mi)
  - Community: 341
- Time zone: UTC+2 (EET)
  - Summer (DST): UTC+3 (EEST)
- Vehicle registration: ΡΙ

Narthaki (Greek: Ναρθάκι) is a village and a former municipality in the Larissa regiona unit, Thessaly, Greece. Since the 2011 local government reform it is part of the municipality Farsala, of which it is a municipal unit. Population 989 (2021). The municipal unit has an area of 164.101 km^{2}.
