= Namata, Kozani =

Namata Νάματα Pipilishta
- Community
- Location within Greece
- Coordinates: 40°25′N 21°31.3′E
- Country: Greece
- Administrative region: Western Macedonia
- Regional unit: Kozani
- Municipality: Voio
- Municipal unit: Askio
- Elevation: 1,140 m (3,740 ft)

Population (2021)
  - Community: 66
- Time zone: UTC+2 (EET)
  - Summer (DST): UTC+3 (EEST)
- Postal code: 500 03
- Area code: +30-2463
- Vehicle registration: ΚΖ

Namata (Greek: Νάματα, before 1928: Πιπιλίστα – Pipilista; Aromanian: Pipilishta) is a village and a community of the Voio municipality. Before the 2011 local government reform it was part of the municipality of Askio, of which it was a municipal district. The 2021 census recorded 66 inhabitants in the village. During Ottoman times, this was a purely Aromanian village.
