= Ampelakia, Larissa =

Ampelakia Αμπελάκια
- Municipal unit
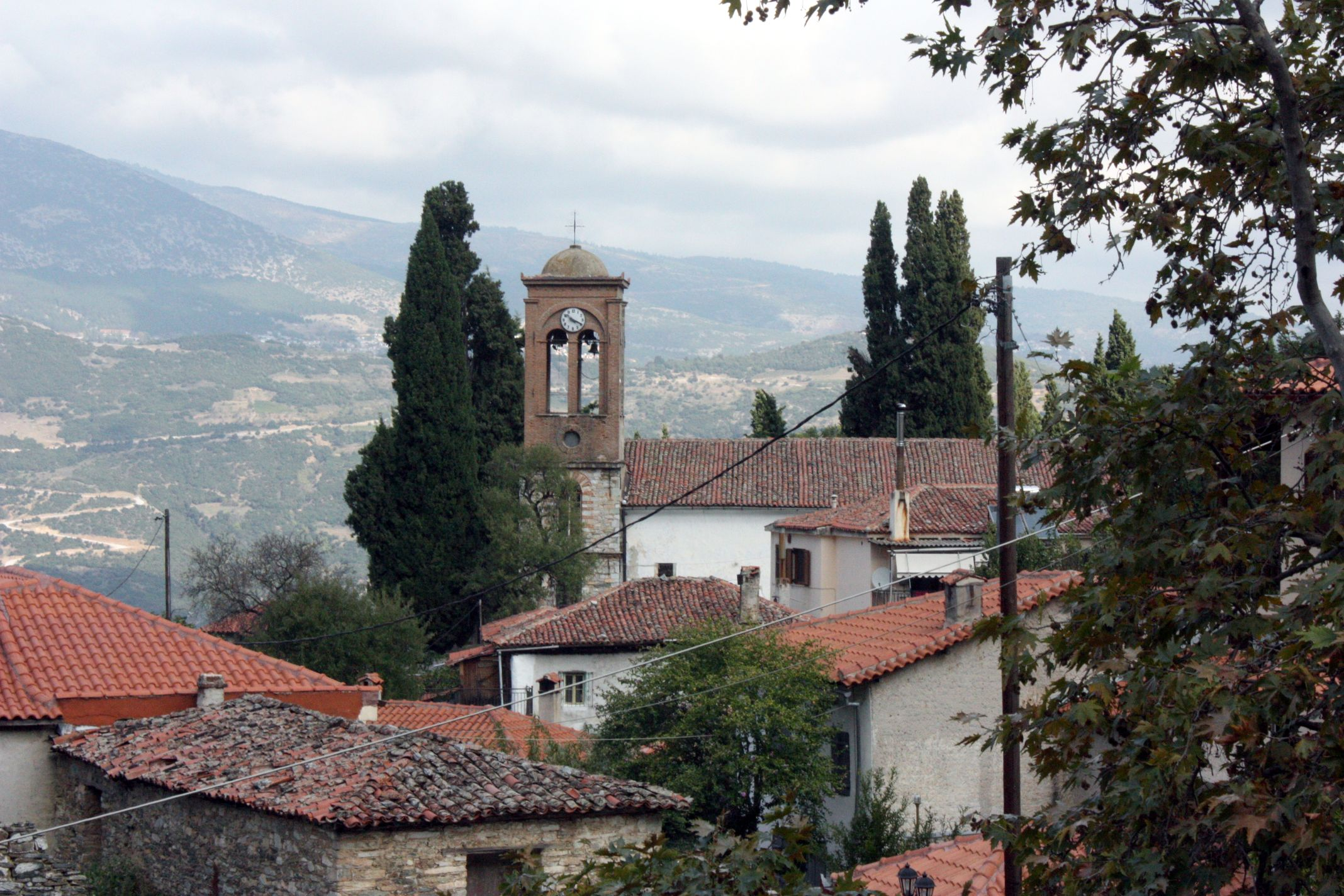
- A view of Ampelakia

- Location within the regional unit

- Location within Greece
- Coordinates: 39°51′N 22°33′E
- Country: Greece
- Administrative region: Thessaly
- Regional unit: Larissa
- Municipality: Tempi

Area
  - Municipal unit: 54.447 km^{2} (21.022 sq mi)
- Elevation: 390 m (1,280 ft)

Population (2021)
  - Municipal unit: 377
  - Municipal unit density: 6.92/km^{2} (17.9/sq mi)
  - Community: 326
- Time zone: UTC+2 (EET)
  - Summer (DST): UTC+3 (EEST)
- Postal code: 400 04
- Area code: +30-2495
- Vehicle registration: ΡΙ

Ampelakia (Greek: Αμπελάκια) is a former municipality in the Larissa regional unit, Thessaly, Greece. Since the 2011 local government reform it is part of the municipality Tempi, of which it is a municipal unit and a municipal community. Ampelakia is also regarded as the historical seat of the municipality.

== Administrative division ==
The municipal unit of Ampelakia comprises two separate municipal communities: Ampelakia and Tempi. The municipal unit has an area of 54.447 km^{2}.

== History ==
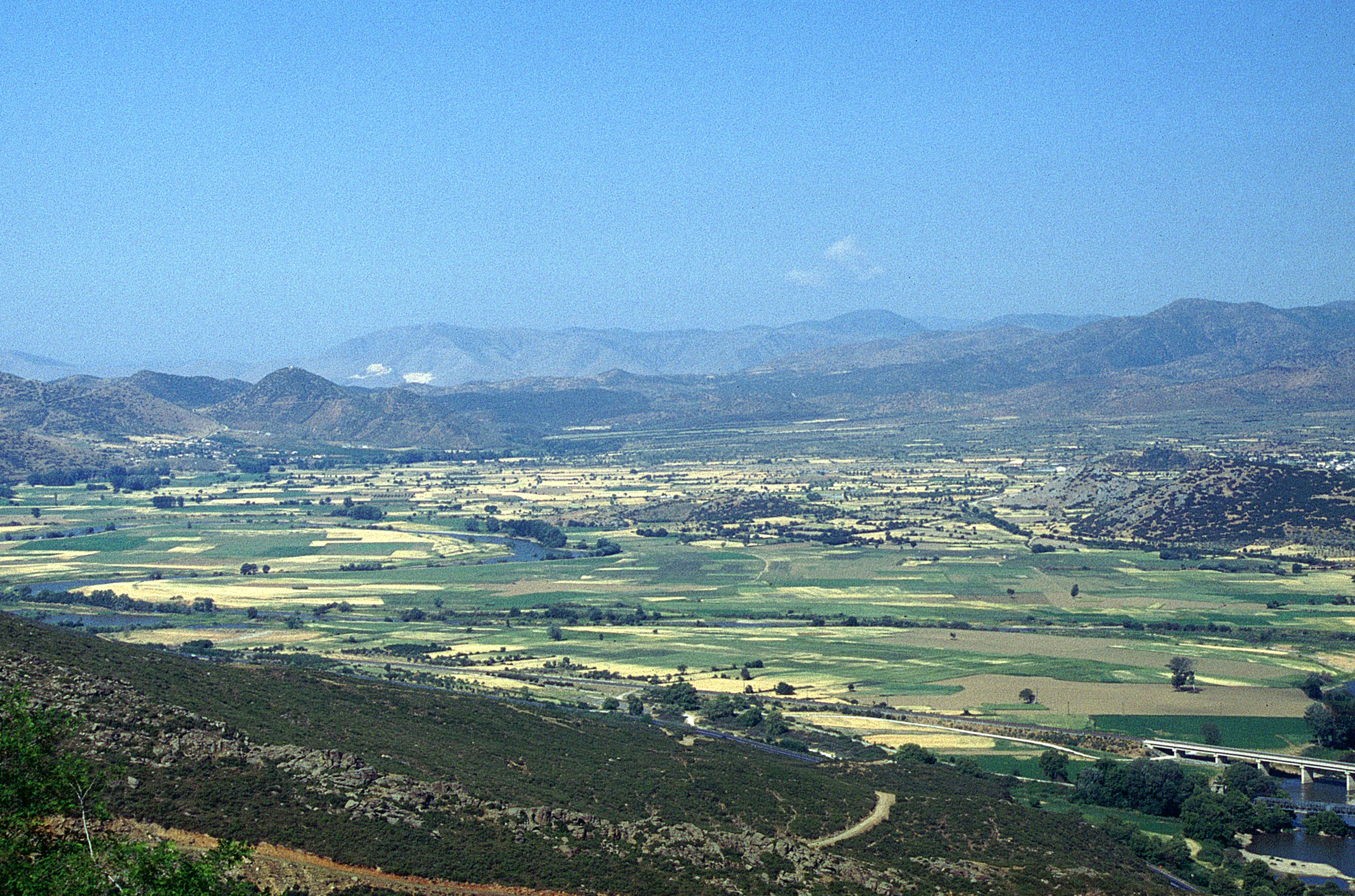
Plain of Ampelakia

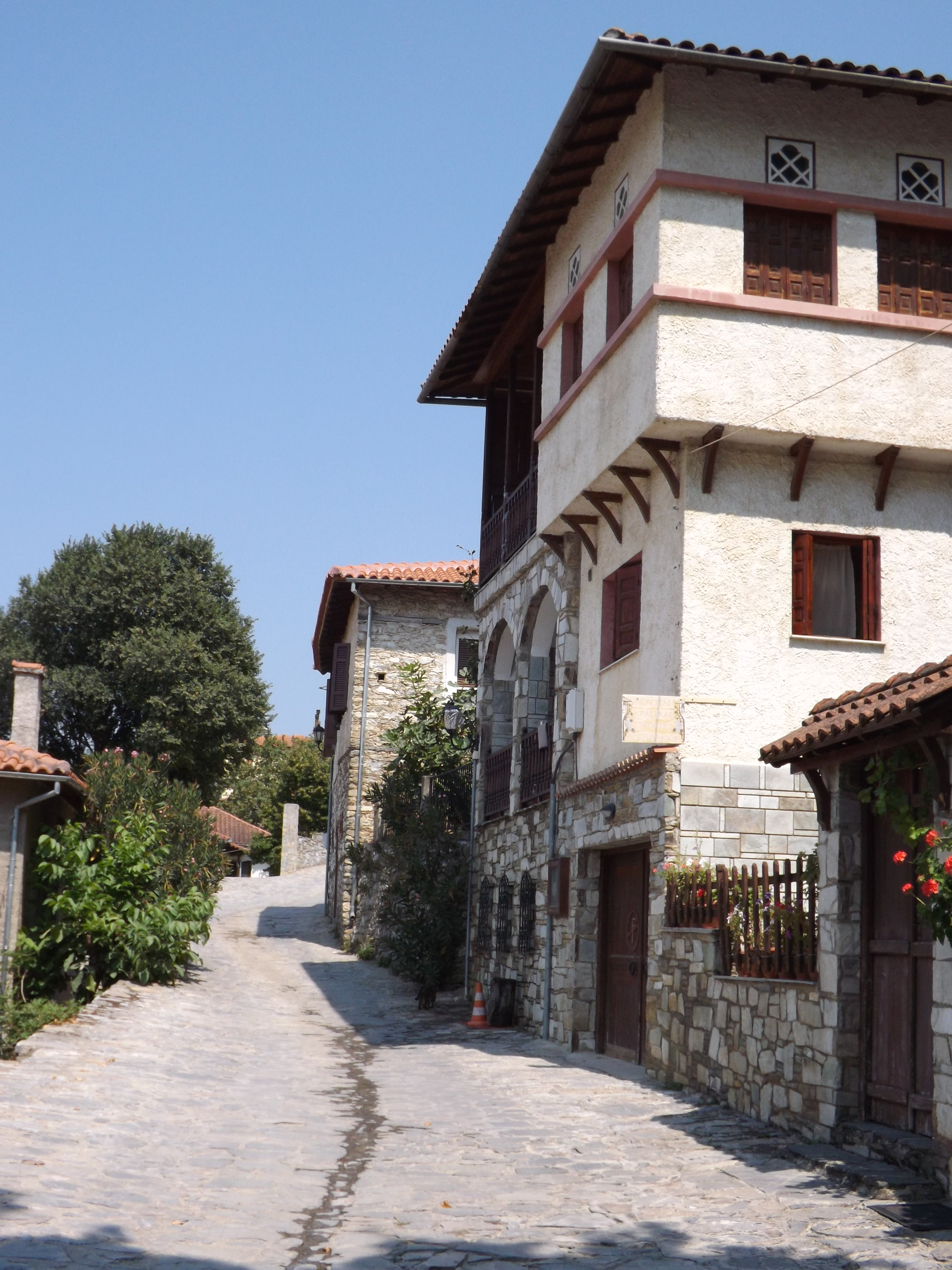
A street in Ampelakia

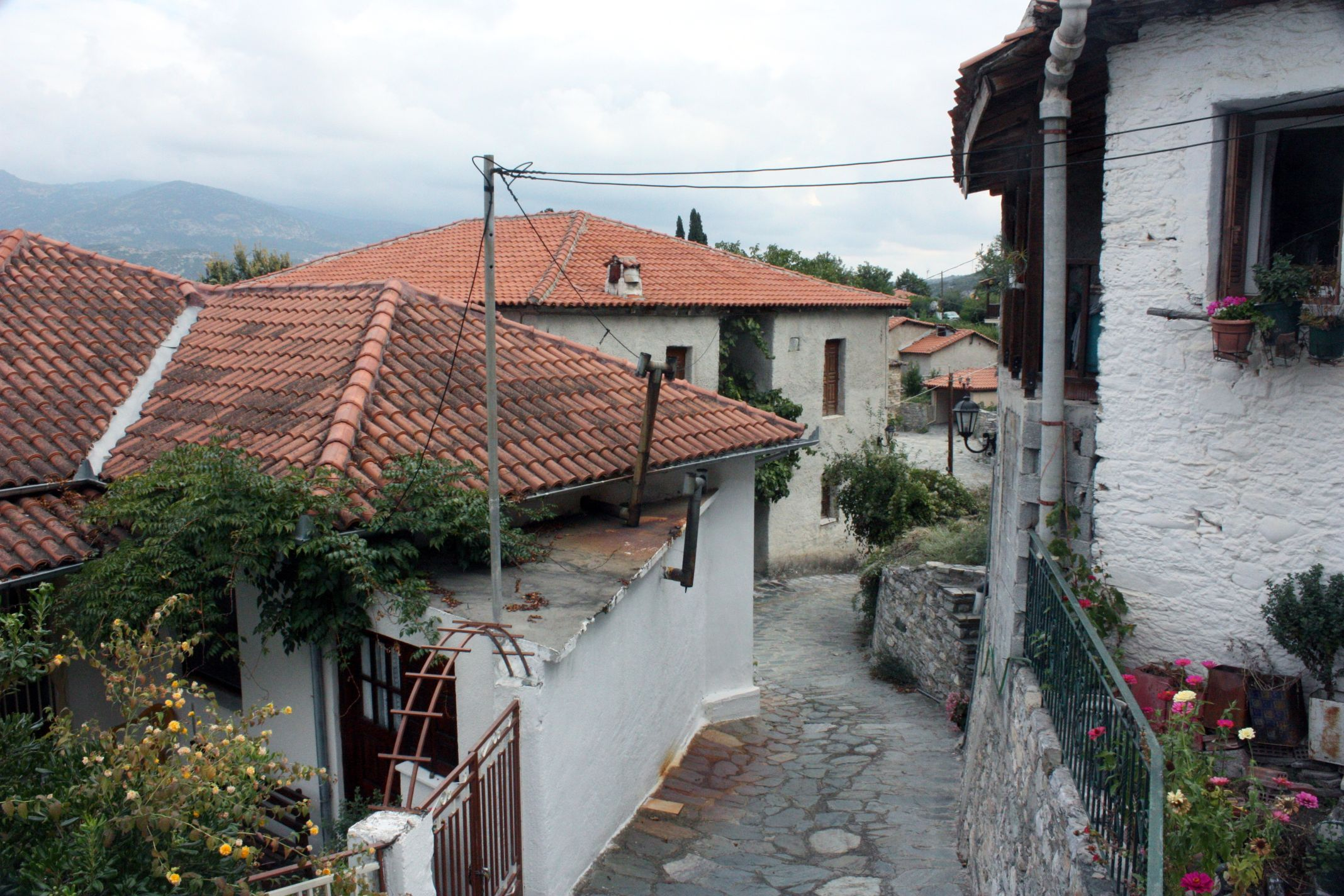
A street

The traveler who will feel the need to visit the historical town of Ampelakia (nicknamed "The jewel of Thessaly"), has to go up the well made road that starts from the Tempe Valley. After just 5 kilometers is Ampelakia. As we get closer to the town the mansion of George Mavros (Schwartz) stands out. There is an unsure knowledge to exactly when and who established Ampelakia because there are no clear documents that attest to this subject. The inscriptions of churches and the recollections of their liturgical elements are the most reliable records about its foundation.

The historian Elias Georgiou ("History and the Cooperative of Ambelakia", Athens 1951, p. 9) published the recollection of the Bishop of Platamon Gregorios, in the ritual which Nikos Gameos bought in 1580 and donated to the old church of Saint Paraskevi. Also, at the First Convention of Studies on Ambelakia, on the 13–15 August 1994, Kostas Spanos, the history researcher, stated that Ampelakia has existed as a settlement at least since the 14th century AD, which means that it is one of the Thessalian settlements of the last Byzantine era.

As far as concerns the name of the village, Ampelakia, some historians claim that it comes from the corruption of the word "Amfilakia" which means a village between two streams. But this is not right because the town is crossed by four streams and not two. The most possible version is that the name of the town comes from the fact that in the village and in the area around it there were a lot of vineyards ("Ambelia" in the Greek language). According to a rescued register of the vineyards in the year 1899, we know that there were 700 owners of vineyards who cultivated 1,100 acres (4.5 km^{2}).

=== Creation of the cooperative ===
Ampelakia, an originally poor village without any navigable rivers and trade routes, had no neighboring towns of industrial significance. Well, how did it manage to present such an important and wondrous achievement which, at the same time, is an epoch-making event. Of course, we mean the foundation, organization and function of the first cooperative in all the world. A cooperative, in which the interests of work wedded to the capital in a marvelous way. The cooperative spirit spread in Greece much earlier than in other European countries. It is a part of the national folk tradition, based on a deep humanitarian spirit and the fair contribution of profits between the people. The first forms of cooperative appear around the 18th century. The most important examples are those of Thrace, sponge-divers of Aegina, the Thessalian Companies of Ampelakia of Tyrnavos, Agia, Zagora, etc. as well as the maritime cooperatives of the islands of Hydra, Spetses, Psara, Symi, Santorini and the maritime towns of Mesembria, Galaxidi and Kranidi.

The most important cooperative organization in Greece is found in Ampelakia, Thessaly. The cooperative of merchants, craftsmen, farmers and laborers of production of the red yarns of Ampelakia flourished in the end of the 18th and the beginning of the 19th century. It is the first and most complete cooperative organization which was formed in Turkish-dominated Greece. Following the example of their neighbors from Meliboea, the people of Ampelakia developed the art of dyeing and spinning. They were provided the cotton they used mainly from the valley of Tempe where it was grown systematically in large quantities. When there was insufficiency and a lot of orders, they were provided from Macedonia, Thessaly, and Asia Minor. The people of Ampelakia spun the cotton in distaff, spindle and then they dyed it scarlet red by means of rizari.

With the help of merchants from Epirus the villagers exported to Austria and Germany. Around 1750–1760, the first company, on a family basis, was formed. Within a few years five companies functioned and employed about a thousand craftsmen. These were the companies of N. Pessios Arsenis Chatziprassas, Drossinos Chatzievos, G. Papaefthymios and George Schwartz. In 1778, the leaders of the companies decided to combine the companies under the name of "Common Company and Brotherhood of Ampelakia".

All the people of Ampelakia, men, women and children were shareholders of that large cooperative business. The landowners share in with their fields, the fund holders with their money, the craftsmen and workers with their work. The minimum sum they could deposit (in order to have a cooperative share) was 5,000 piasters, that is 1,700 francs) whereas the maximum one was 20,000 piastres (that is 6,800 francs). This limit was decided on so that no fund holder should dominate over the cooperative. The big fund holders and anyone who held more than 20,000 piasters deposited in the common saving bank with the annual interest of 12%. In 1780 the Co-operative had 6,000 members. The Cooperative had totally 24 workshops: laundries, dyer's shops, places where they elaborated the scarlet red yarns, which were exported abroad.

When the producers gave the cotton, a special committee evaluated it and took half its value in advance, whereas the rest of it at the end of the year after balancing the annual account and adding the profit which fell to their share. Each worker had an open credit account by virtue of his/her wages. He/She could withdrawn from it a certain sum in order to maintain the family, etc. In the end of the year there has been a pay-off for them after adding the profit, which fell to their share. The general meeting of the shareholders, which was the sovereign board, decided on the modification of the articles, or, generally, on any other matter of the cooperative.

Every third year, a five-member board of directors was elected by the general meeting, as well as an auditing committee of twelve member the board of directors was responsible for the management of all the works of the co-operative, keeping all account books and the appointment of the employees abroad. They also found and organized the various agencies and branches in the interior and abroad. The auditing committee checked the whole financial management of the co-operative, which was submitted by the board of directors, as well as the annual balance and report. As a highest force, the auditing committee had great rights: in the annual general meeting they submitted a detailed report for the whole activity of the co-operative.

The most important trading agencies and branches of the co-operative were in Vienna (the central one), Trieste (Austria), Leipzig, Anbach, Dresden, Hamburg (Germany), London (England), Amsterdam (Netherlands), Budapest (Hungary), Odessa (Russia), Lyon and Rouen (France), Constantinople, Smyrna and Thessaloniki where there were big Greek colonies. All the agents, representatives and employees were all from Ampelakia and members of the co-operative. Many of them worked and at the same time studied at the Universities. The representatives often changed so that as many people from Ampelakia as possible could go abroad in order to learn and convey the culture to Ampelakia. In 1797 they ordered their own ship, the Calypso in order to carry their yarns to Europe.

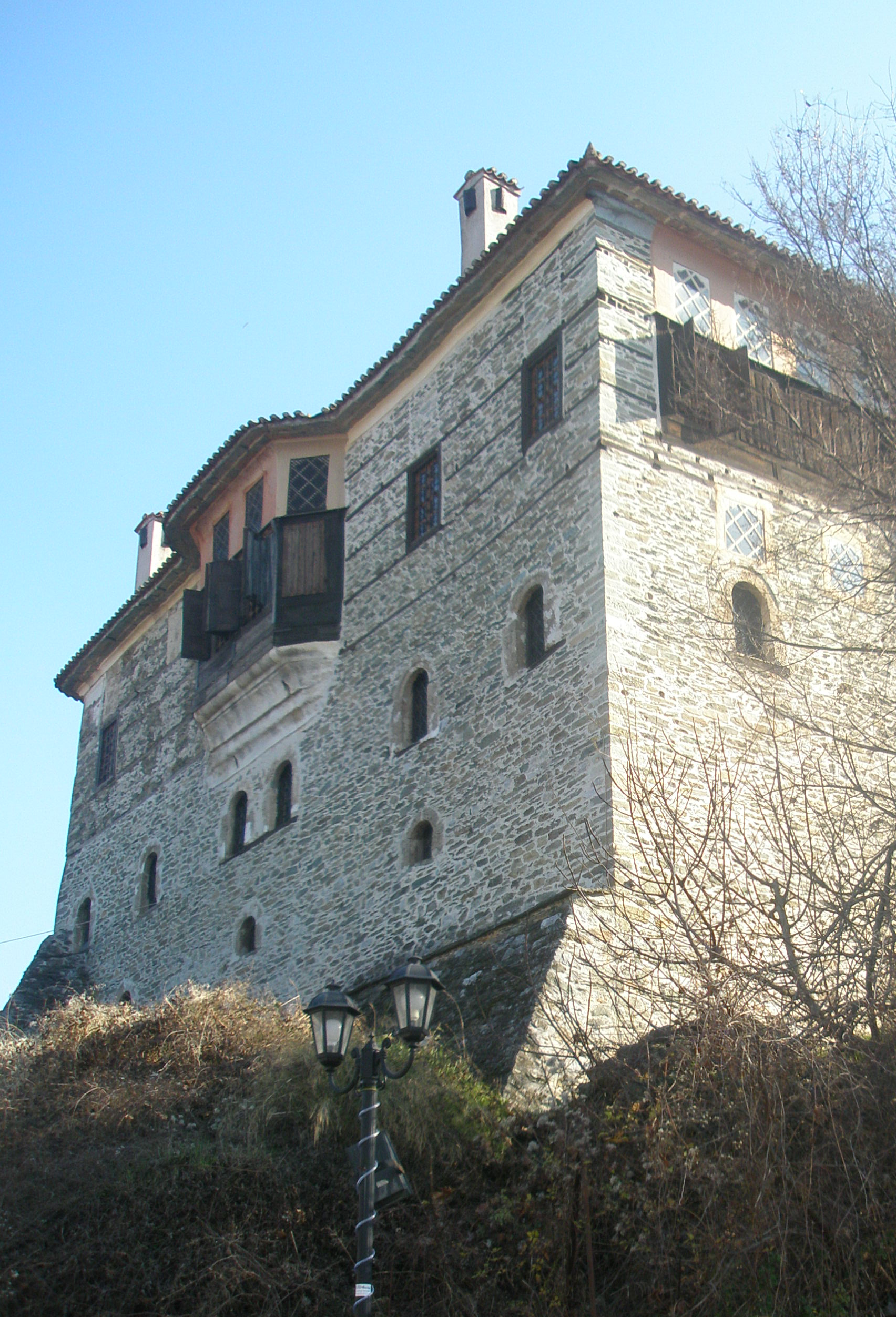
The mansion of Georgios Mavros (Schwarz).

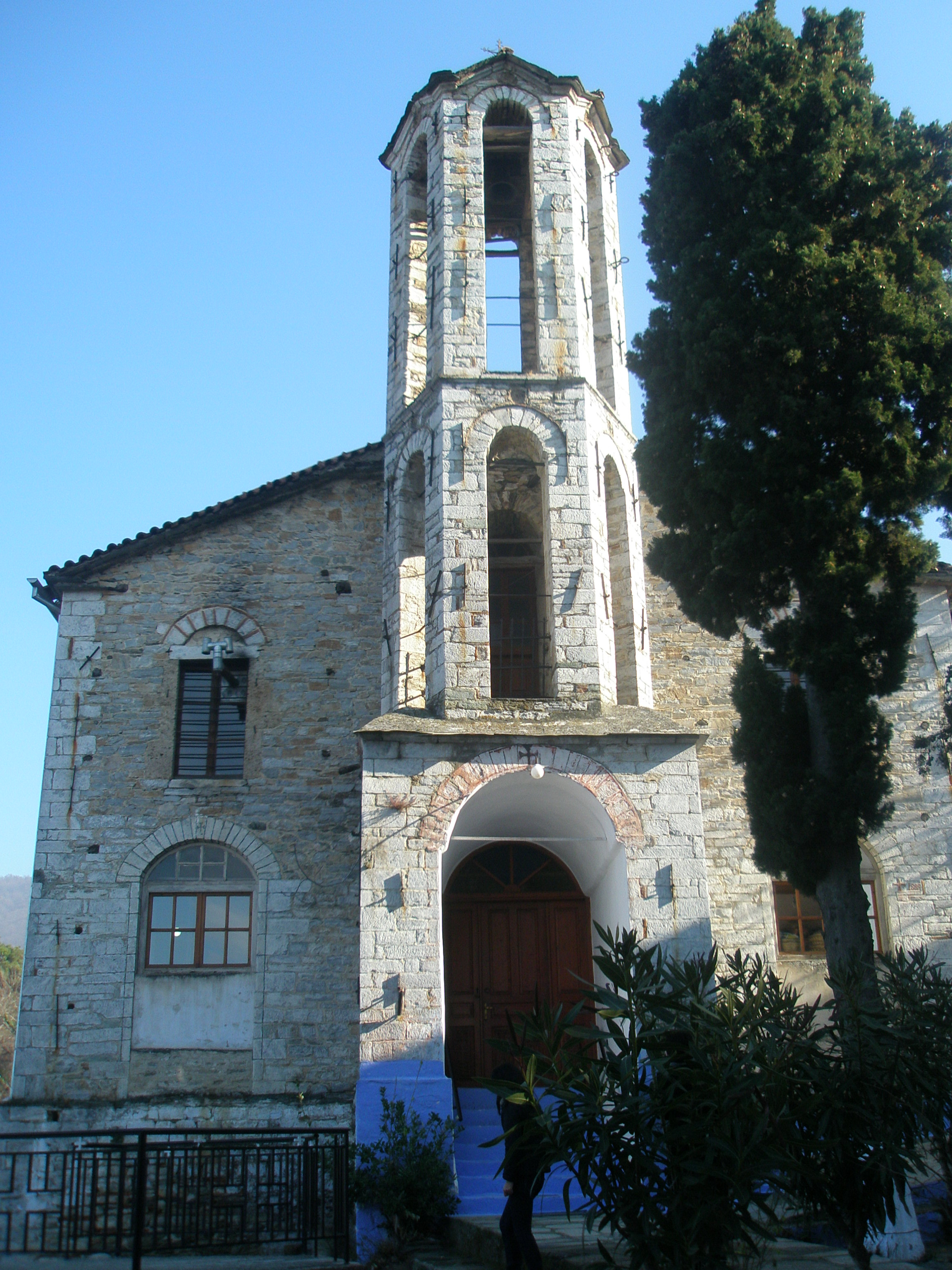
Saint Athanasius church

Other time, a number of buildings - mansions- were constructed like the ones of George Schwartz (1787–1798), his brother, Dimitrios Schwartz, Efthymiadis Solomos, Tsilikis Krassoulis, Lioulias and many others. The people of Ampelakia spoke fluently German, French, English and Italian. There was a theater and a school of the kind of a college, the famous "Ellinomousion" where since 1749 the most famous Greek scholars and men of letters taught like : Eugenious Voulgaris, K.Koumas, Greg.Konstantas, G.Triantafylloy, Sp.Assanis, Polyzonis G. Trikalinos and others. After a written promise composed at Ambelakia on the 2-2-1804 and which is in the possession of the Cultural Association of Ambelakia, the people of Ampelakia assisted financially Anthemos Gazis for the printing of the "Dictionary of the Greek Language".

The Turks may have not raided Ampelakia but the people of it contributed greatly to the Greek Revolution with a lot of sacrifices and offers of money and blood. All the emigrated merchants and representatives of Ampelakia were members of the Society of Friends (= Filiki Heteria) and afforded great sums of money for the Revolution since the co-operative enjoyed enormous prosperity. In 1810 its capitals had become excessively thousandfold, just to mention that the surplus of that year amounted to 20,000,000 francs. But, unfortunately, for Ampelakia, the Modern Greek civilization and, generally, the universally financial, common life this famous co-operative did not last long it dissolved in 1812.

After the dissolution of the co-operative, some of the people who remained at Ampelakia cultivated vineyards, some others occupied themselves with cattle breeding or various temporary jobs.

Its bibliography is rich and numbers about 360 editions till today.

== See also ==
- Vale of Tempe
