= Armenio =

Armenio Αρμένιο
- Municipal unit
- Location within the regional unit

- Location within Greece
- Coordinates: 39°29′N 22°42′E
- Country: Greece
- Administrative region: Thessaly
- Regional unit: Larissa
- Municipality: Kileler

Area
  - Municipal unit: 99.403 km^{2} (38.380 sq mi)
  - Community: 23.329 km^{2} (9.007 sq mi)
- Elevation: 58 m (190 ft)

Population (2021)
  - Municipal unit: 1,701
  - Municipal unit density: 17.11/km^{2} (44.32/sq mi)
  - Community: 688
  - Community density: 29.5/km^{2} (76.4/sq mi)
- Time zone: UTC+2 (EET)
  - Summer (DST): UTC+3 (EEST)
- Vehicle registration: ΡΙ

Armenio (Greek: Αρμένιο) is a village and a former municipality in the Larissa regional unit, Thessaly, Greece. Since the 2011 local government reform it is part of the municipality Kileler, of which it is a municipal unit. Population 1,701 (2021). The municipal unit has an area of 99.403 km^{2}.
