= Kileler =

Village and municipality in Greece

Kileler Κιλελέρ
- Municipality
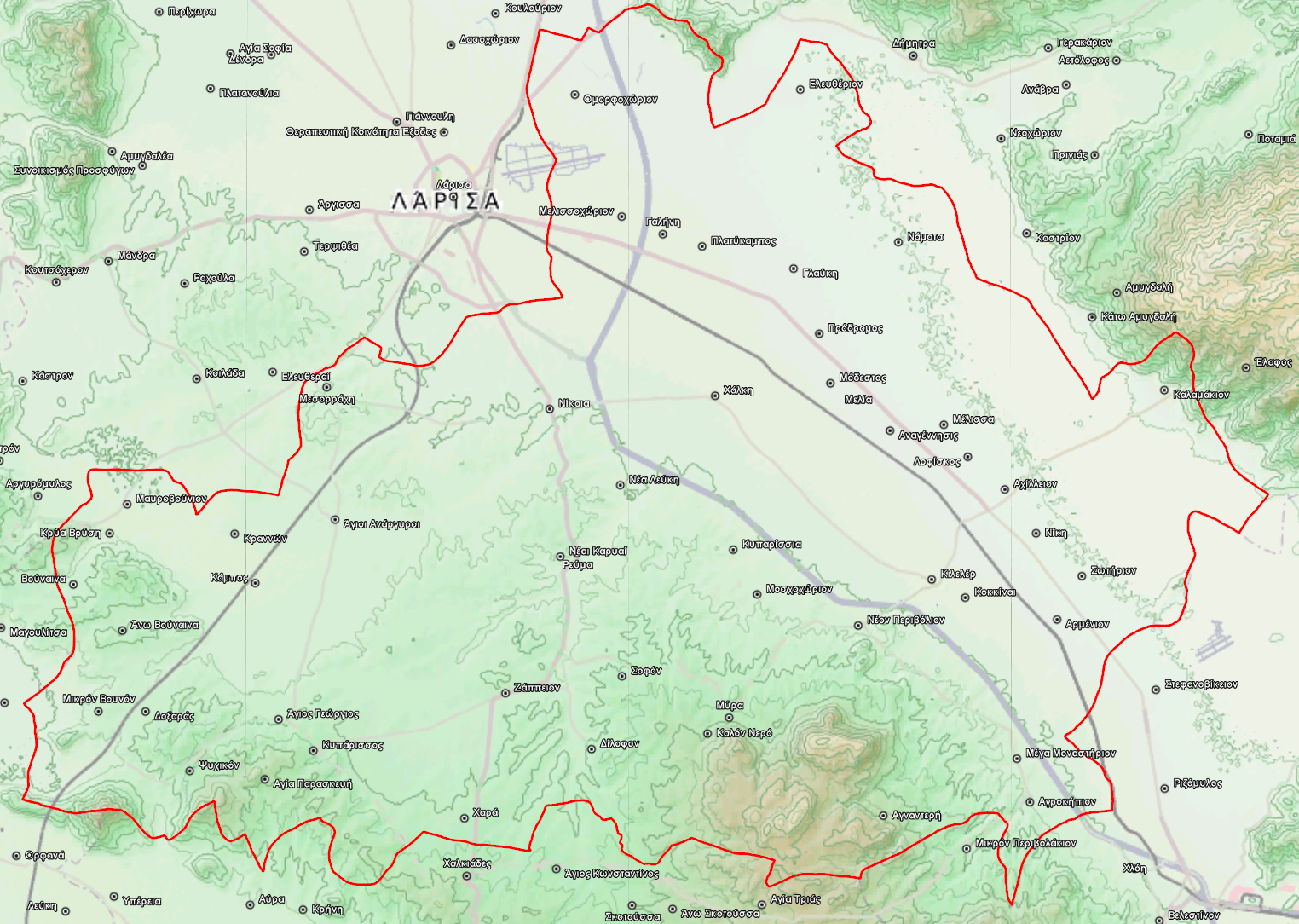

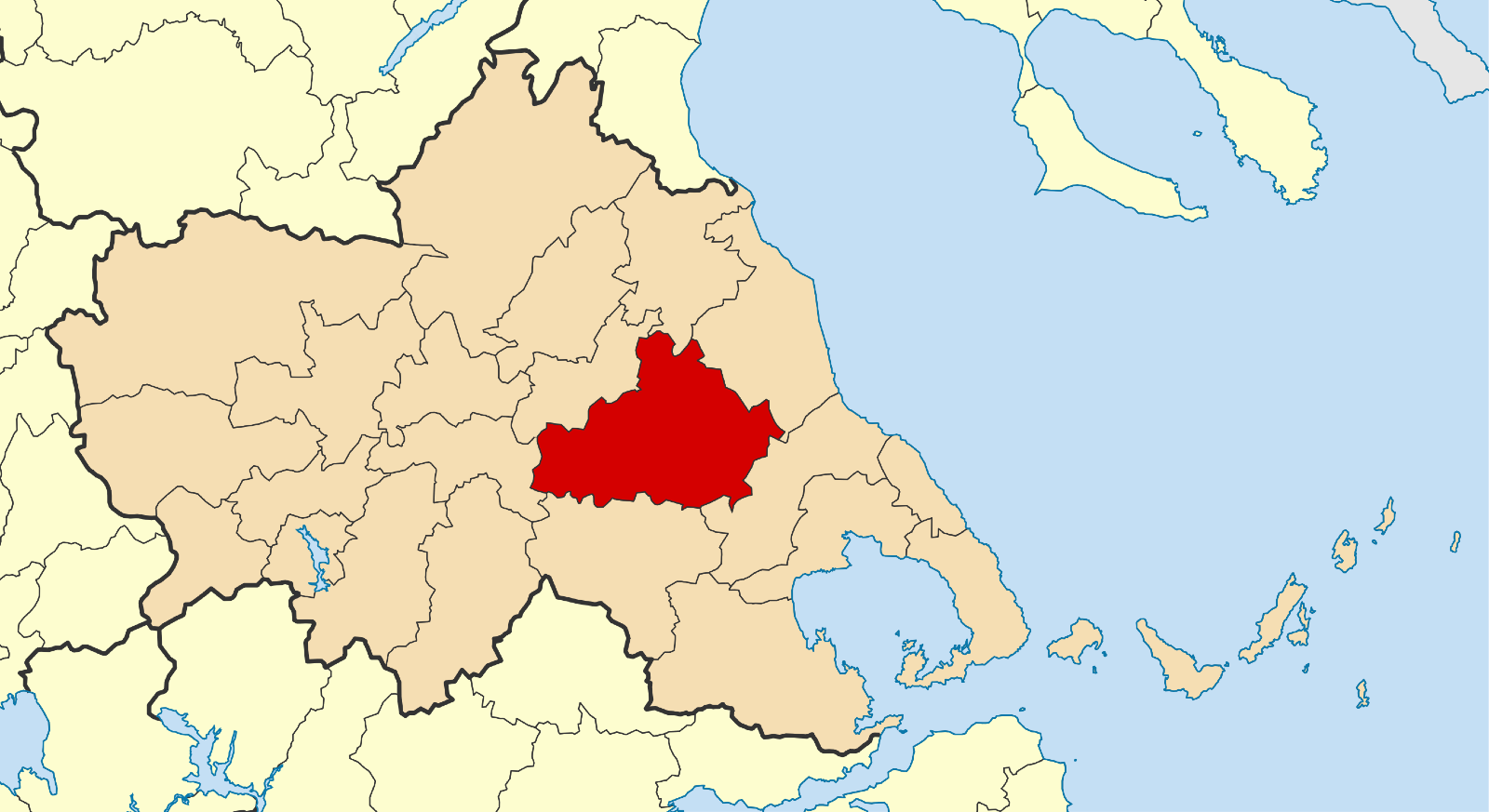

- Location within Greece
- Coordinates: 39°30′N 22°38′E
- Country: Greece
- Administrative region: Thessaly
- Regional unit: Larissa

Area
  - Municipality: 976.3 km^{2} (377.0 sq mi)
  - Municipal unit: 147.35 km^{2} (56.89 sq mi)
  - Community: 34.478 km^{2} (13.312 sq mi)

Population (2021)
  - Municipality: 18,070
  - Density: 18.51/km^{2} (47.94/sq mi)
  - Municipal unit: 1,719
  - Municipal unit density: 11.67/km^{2} (30.22/sq mi)
  - Community: 443
  - Community density: 12.8/km^{2} (33.3/sq mi)
- Time zone: UTC+2 (EET)
  - Summer (DST): UTC+3 (EEST)
- Vehicle registration: ΡΙ

Kileler (Greek: Κιλελέρ, romanized: Kilelér, between 1919 and 1985: Κυψέλη - Kypseli) is a village and a municipality in the regional unit of Larissa in Greece. The seat of the municipality is in Nikaia. The village became known for the Kileler incident that occurred on March 6, 1910.

== Transport ==
The village is served by Kypseli railway station, on the Larissa-Volos branch line

== Municipality ==
The municipality Kileler was formed at the 2011 local government reform by the merger of the following 5 former municipalities, that became municipal units:

- Armenio
- Kileler
- Krannonas
- Nikaia
- Platykampos

The municipality Kileler has an area of 976.26 km^{2}, the municipal unit Kileler has an area of 147.350 km^{2}, and the community Kileler has an area of 34.478 km^{2}.
