= Platykampos =

Platykampos Πλατύκαμπος
- Municipal unit
- Location within the regional unit

- Location within Greece
- Coordinates: 39°37′N 22°32′E
- Country: Greece
- Administrative region: Thessaly
- Regional unit: Larissa
- Municipality: Kileler

Area
  - Municipal unit: 244.7 km^{2} (94.5 sq mi)
  - Community: 28.308 km^{2} (10.930 sq mi)

Population (2021)
  - Municipal unit: 7,207
  - Municipal unit density: 29.45/km^{2} (76.28/sq mi)
  - Community: 1,603
  - Community density: 56.63/km^{2} (146.7/sq mi)
- Time zone: UTC+2 (EET)
  - Summer (DST): UTC+3 (EEST)
- Vehicle registration: ΡΙ

Platykampos (Greek: Πλατύκαμπος) is a village and a former municipality in the Larissa regional unit, Thessaly, Greece. Since the 2011 local government reform it is part of the municipality Kileler, of which it is a municipal unit. Population 7,207 (2021). The municipal unit has an area of 244.698 km^{2}.
