= Nessonas =

Nessonas Νέσσωνας
- Municipal unit
- Location within the regional unit

- Location within Greece
- Coordinates: 39°46′N 22°35′E
- Country: Greece
- Administrative region: Thessaly
- Regional unit: Larissa
- Municipality: Tempi

Area
  - Municipal unit: 172.675 km^{2} (66.670 sq mi)

Population (2021)
  - Municipal unit: 3,945
  - Municipal unit density: 22.85/km^{2} (59.17/sq mi)
  - Community: 103
- Time zone: UTC+2 (EET)
  - Summer (DST): UTC+3 (EEST)
- Vehicle registration: ΡΙ

Nessonas (Greek: Νέσσωνας) is a village and a former municipality in the Larissa regional unit, Thessaly, Greece. Since the 2011 local government reform it is part of the municipality Tempi, of which it is a municipal unit. Population 3,945 (2021). The municipal unit has an area of 172.675 km^{2}. The seat of the municipality was in Sykourio.
