= Thessalian plain =

Plain in Thessaly, Greece

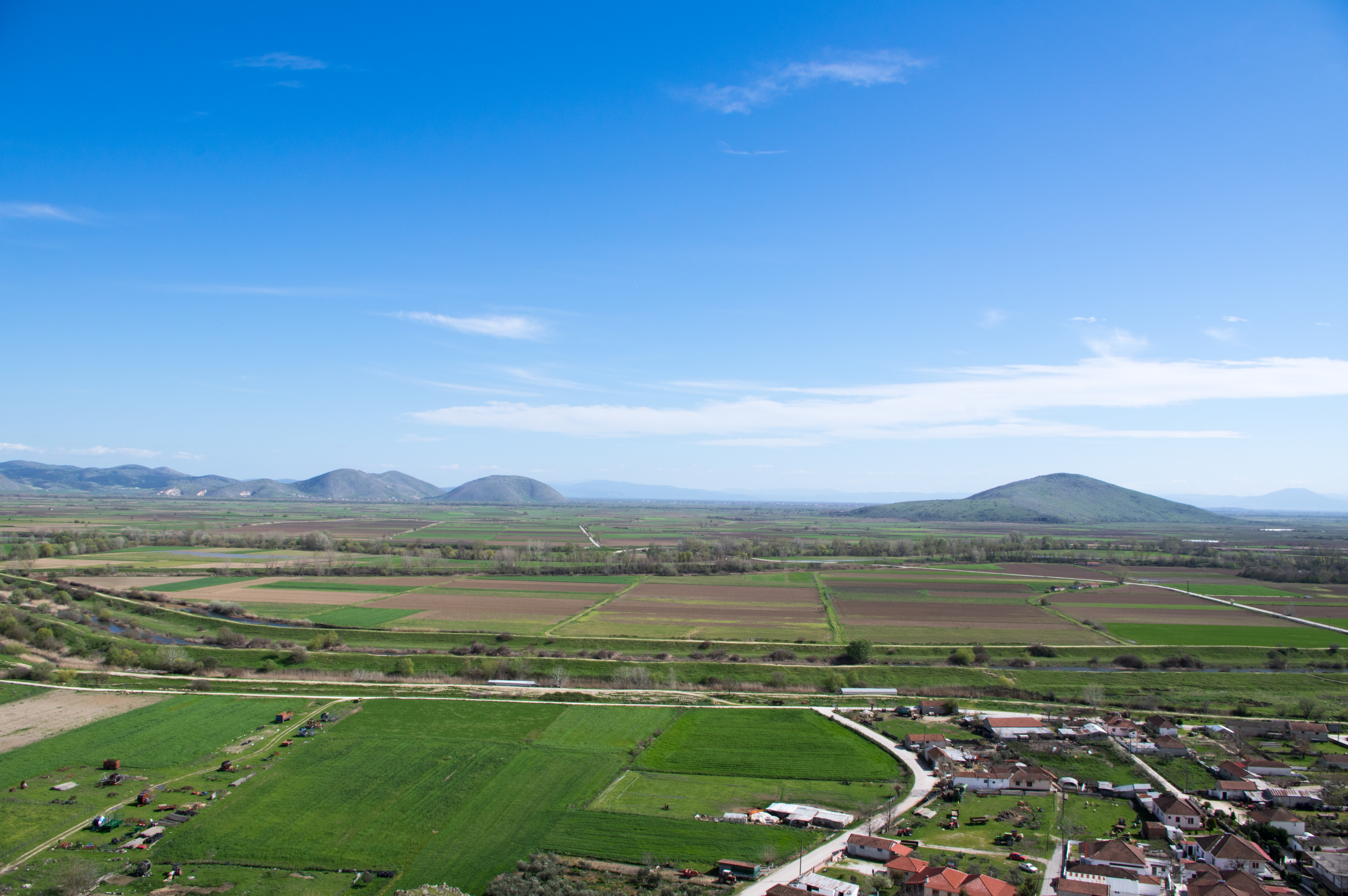
Photo of the Thessalian plain from the 1st of April, 2015

The Thessalian plain (Greek: Θεσσαλική πεδιάδα, Θεσσαλικός κάμπος) is the dominant geographical feature of the Greek region of Thessaly.

The plain is formed by the Pineios River and its tributaries and is surrounded by mountains: the Pindus mountain range to the west, which separates Thessaly from Epirus; Mount Othrys and its outliers in the south; Mount Pelion to the east; Mount Ossa and Mount Olympus to the northeast, with the pass of the Tempe Valley leading to Macedonia; and the Chasia and Kamvounia mountains to the north.

The plain was extremely fertile, and up until the early 20th century the area was a breadbasket for Greece. The existence of the plain also made Thessaly one of the few areas in ancient Greece that could field large numbers of cavalry; the Thessalian cavalry was an important component in the Ancient Macedonian army of Philip II and Alexander the Great.

== Gallery ==
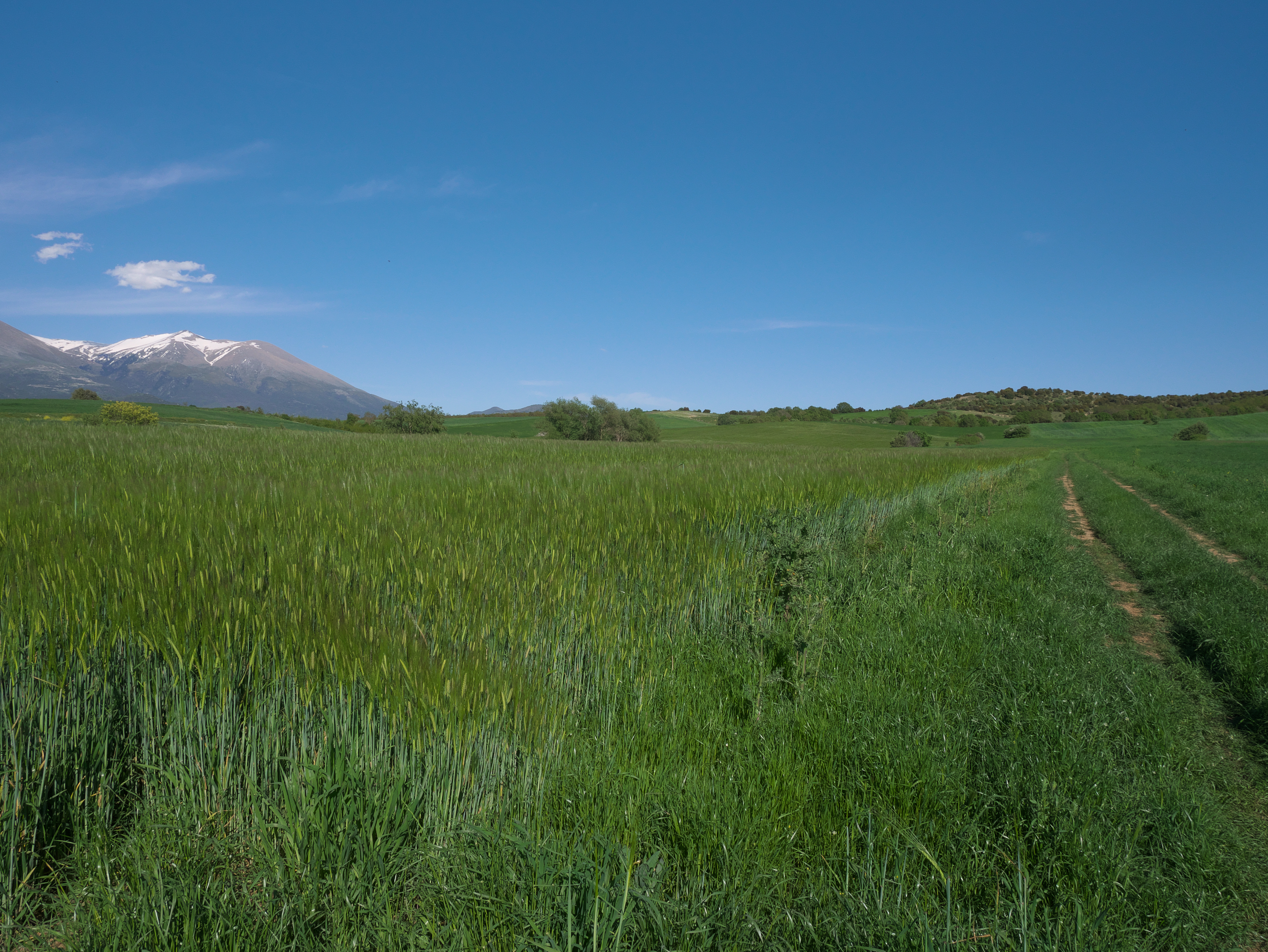

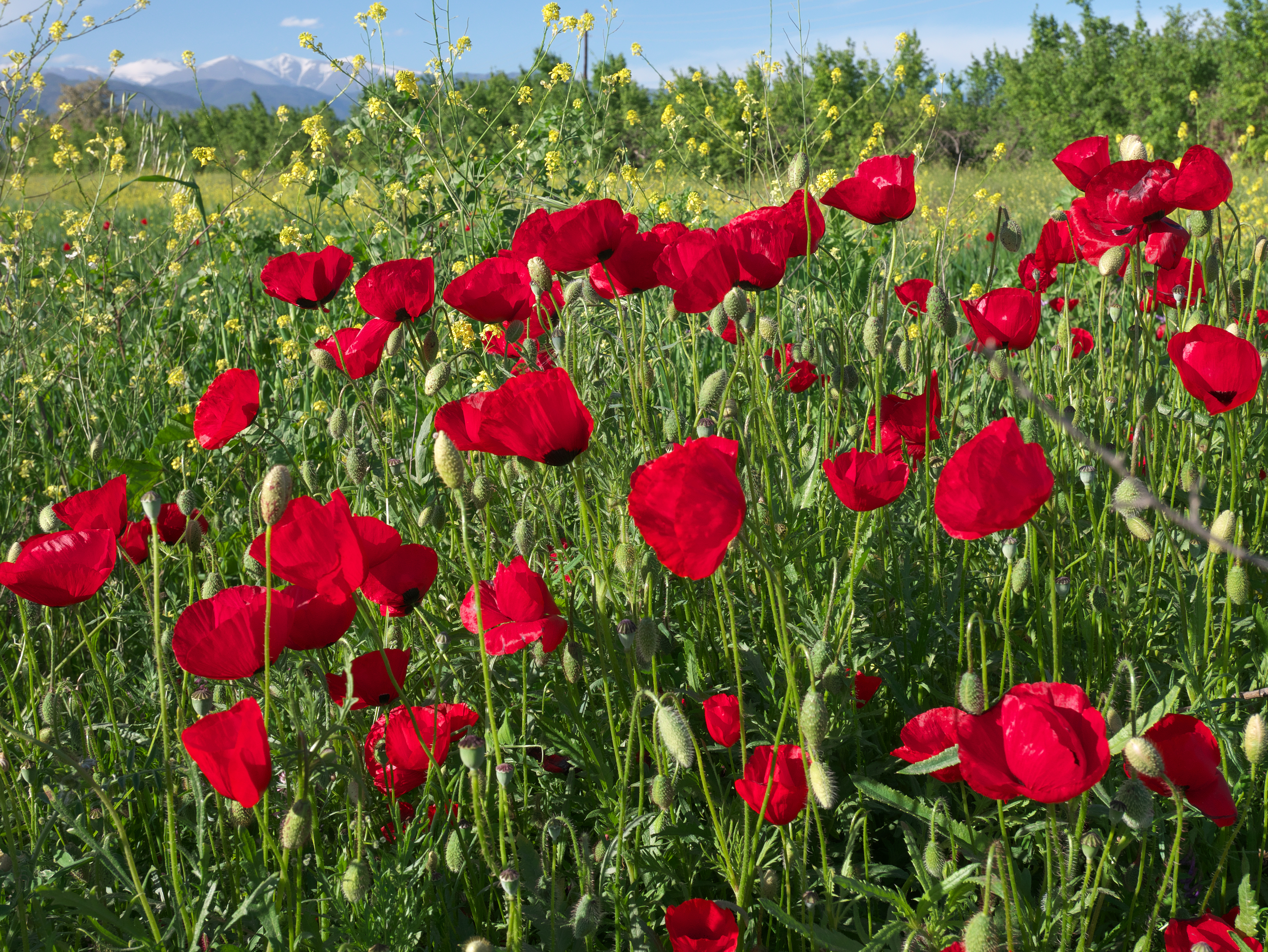

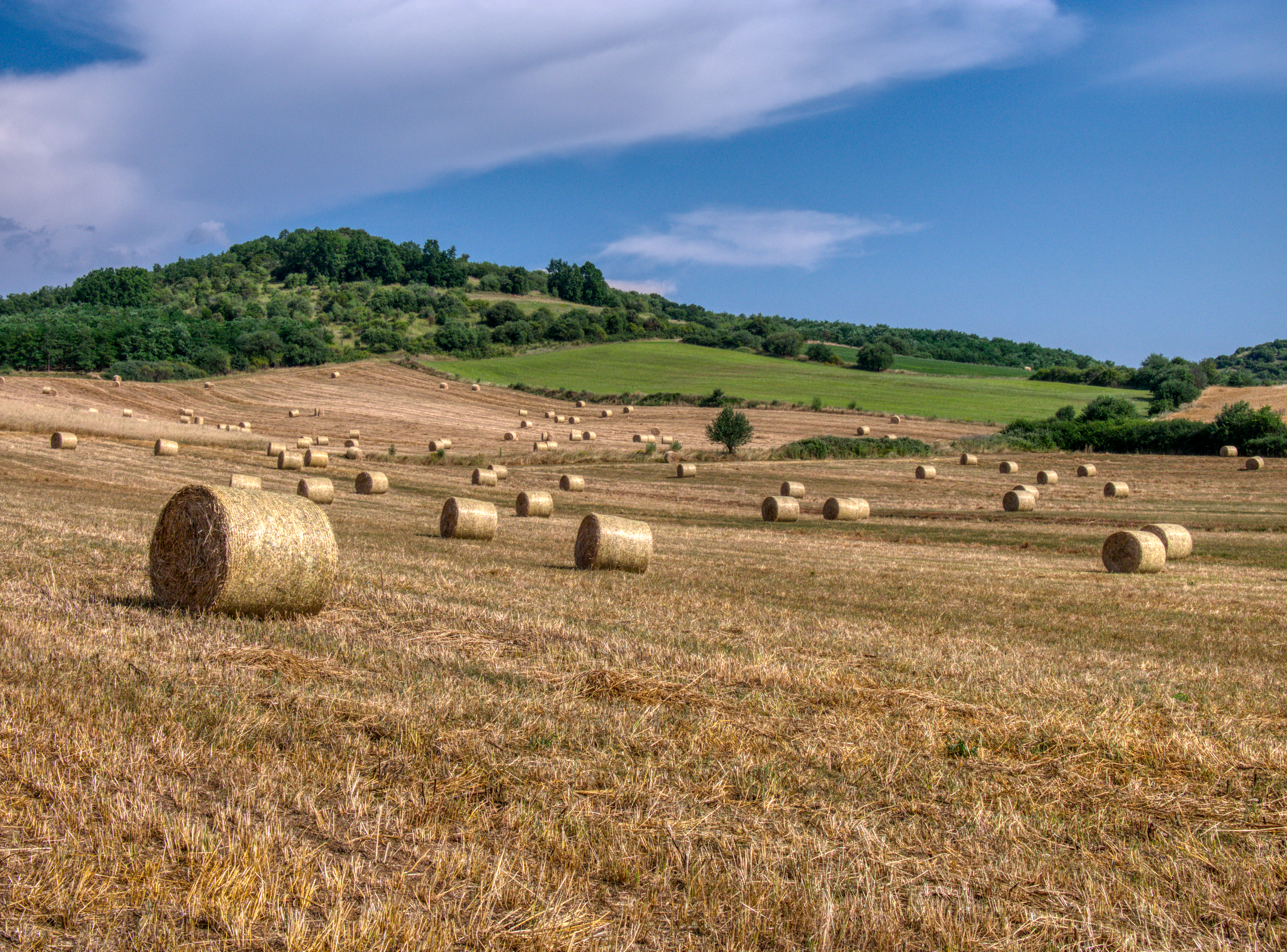

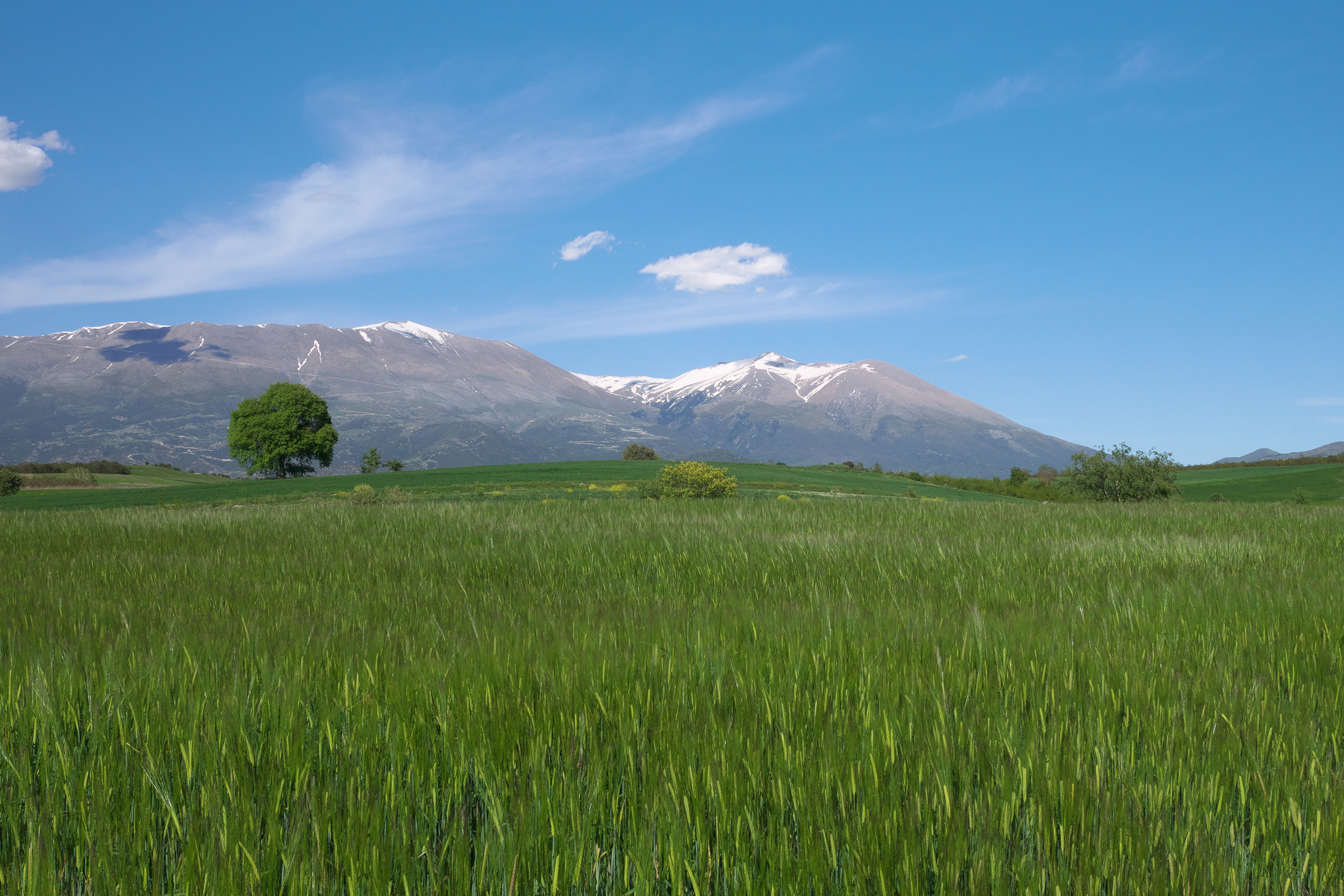
