= Koilada =

Koilada Κοιλάδα
- Municipal unit
- Location within the regional unit

- Location within Greece
- Coordinates: 39°35′N 22°18′E
- Country: Greece
- Administrative region: Thessaly
- Regional unit: Larissa
- Municipality: Larissa

Area
  - Municipal unit: 162.3 km^{2} (62.7 sq mi)
  - Community: 22.071 km^{2} (8.522 sq mi)
- Elevation: 140 m (460 ft)

Population (2021)
  - Municipal unit: 3,256
  - Municipal unit density: 20.06/km^{2} (51.96/sq mi)
  - Community: 480
  - Community density: 22/km^{2} (56/sq mi)
- Time zone: UTC+2 (EET)
  - Summer (DST): UTC+3 (EEST)
- Vehicle registration: ΡΙ

Koilada (Greek: Κοιλάδα) is a village and a former municipality in the Larissa regional unit, Thessaly, Greece. Since the 2011 local government reform it is part of the municipality Larissa, of which it is a municipal unit. Population 3,256 (2021). The municipal unit has an area of 162.299 km^{2}.
