= Tempi (municipality) =

Municipality in Thessaly, Greece

Tempi Τέμπη
- Municipality
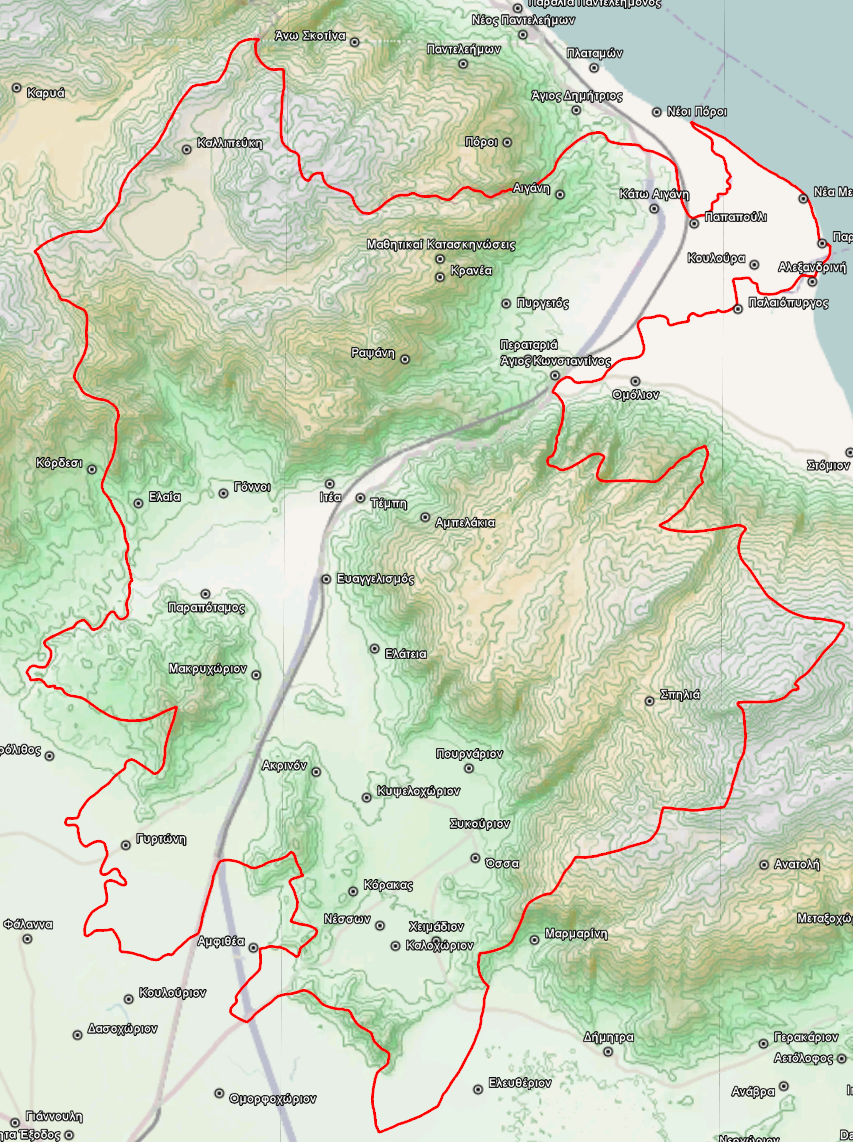

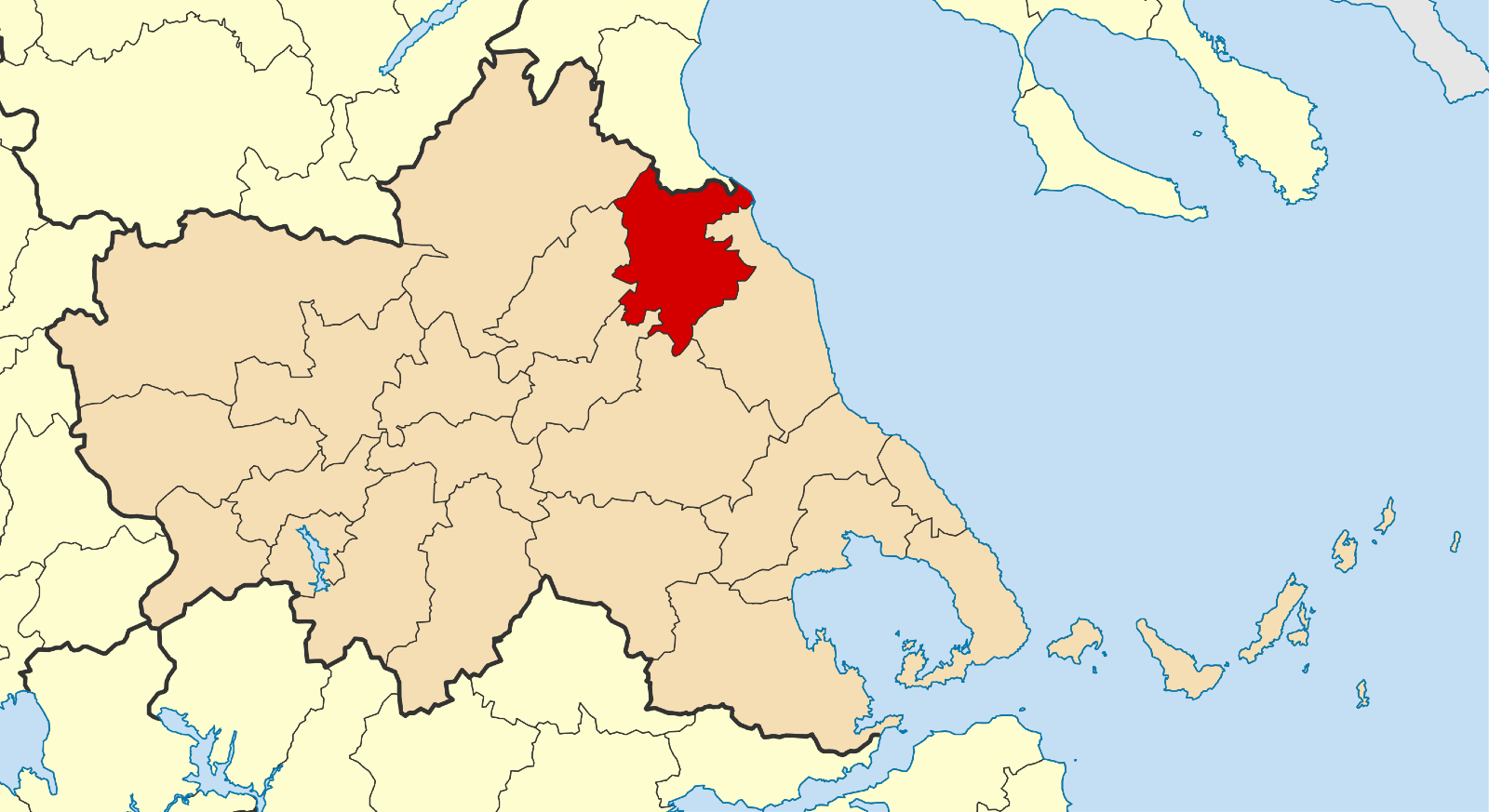

- Location within Greece
- Coordinates: 39°48′N 22°29′E
- Country: Greece
- Administrative region: Thessaly
- Regional unit: Larissa
- Seat: Makrychori

Area
  - Municipality: 577.0 km^{2} (222.8 sq mi)

Population (2021)
  - Municipality: 12,007
  - Density: 20.81/km^{2} (53.90/sq mi)
- Time zone: UTC+2 (EET)
  - Summer (DST): UTC+3 (EEST)

Tempi (Greek: Δήμος Τεμπών, romanized: Dímos Tembón [ˈðimos temˈbon]) is a municipality in the Larissa regional unit, Thessaly, Greece. The seat of the municipality is the town Makrychori. The municipality was named after the Vale of Tempe.

== Municipality ==
The municipality Tempi was formed at the 2011 local government reform by the merger of the following 5 former municipalities, that became municipal units:

- Ampelakia
- Gonnoi
- Kato Olympos
- Makrychori
- Nessonas

== See also ==
- Tempi train crash
