= Potamia, Elassona =

Potamia Ποταμιά
- Municipal unit
- Location within the regional unit

- Location within Greece
- Coordinates: 39°41′N 22°04′E
- Country: Greece
- Administrative region: Thessaly
- Regional unit: Larissa
- Municipality: Elassona

Area
  - Municipal unit: 200.28 km^{2} (77.33 sq mi)

Population (2021)
  - Municipal unit: 3,139
  - Municipal unit density: 15.67/km^{2} (40.59/sq mi)
- Time zone: UTC+2 (EET)
  - Summer (DST): UTC+3 (EEST)
- Vehicle registration: ΡΙ

Potamia (Greek: Ποταμιά) is a municipal unit of the municipality of Elassona in the Larissa regional unit of Thessaly, Greece. It covers an area of 200.279 km^{2} and has a population of 3,139 according to the 2021 census. Before the 2011 local government reform, it was a separate municipality. The seat of the municipality was in Vlachogianni. Its name is derived from the Greek word "potamià", which means "land with many rivers" (from potamòs, river).
