= Larissa (regional unit) =

Larissa Περιφερειακή ενότητα Λάρισας
- Regional unit
- Municipalities of Larissa

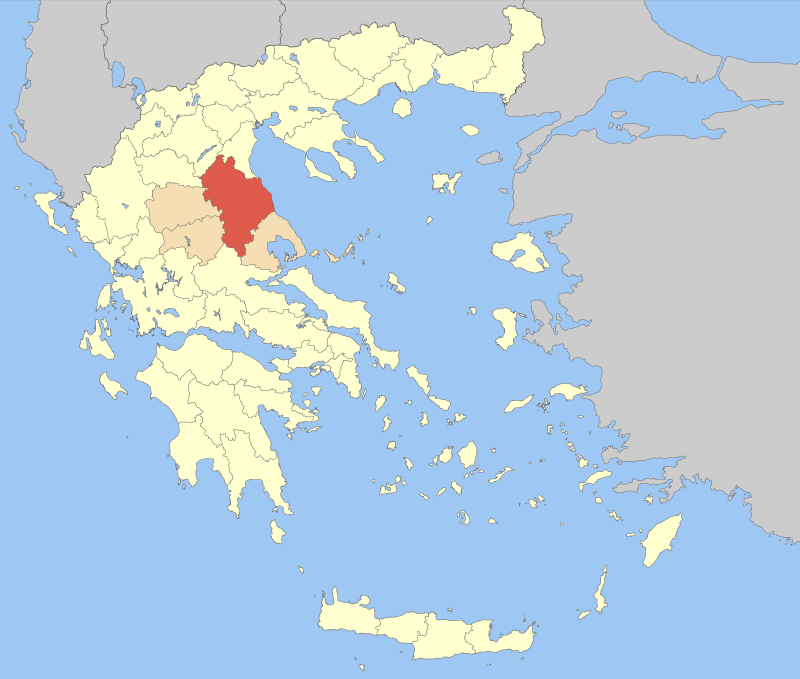
- Larissa within Greece

- Location within Greece
- Coordinates: 39°40′N 22°30′E
- Country: Greece
- Administrative region: Thessaly
- Seat: Larissa

Area
  - Total: 5,381 km^{2} (2,078 sq mi)

Population (2021)
  - Total: 268,963
  - Density: 49.98/km^{2} (129.5/sq mi)
- Time zone: UTC+2 (EET)
  - Summer (DST): UTC+3 (EEST)
- Postal code: 40x xx, 41x xx
- Area code: 241, 2491-2495
- Vehicle registration: ΡΙ

Larissa (Greek: Περιφερειακή ενότητα Λάρισας) is one of the regional units of Greece, located in the region of Thessaly. Its capital is the city of Larissa, after which it is named. According to the 2021 census, it has a total population of 268,963.

== Geography ==
Larissa is the second largest regional unit in Greece, exceeded only by Aetolia-Acarnania. It covers about one-third of Thessaly. It borders the regional units of Kozani to the northwest, Pieria to the northeast, the Aegean Sea to the east, Magnesia to the southeast, Phthiotis to the south, Karditsa to the southwest and Trikala to the west.

The tallest mountain in Greece, Mount Olympus (2,917 m) is situated in the northeastern part of the regional unit. Mount Ossa is situated in the east, at the Aegean coast. The lower stretch of the river Pineios flows through the Vale of Tempe, between Olympus and Ossa.

The northern part is covered with forests, but most of the regional unit is fertile land, the Thessalian Plain.

=== Climate ===
Larissa has a mainly Mediterranean climate with hot summers and mild winters. Winter is harsher in the mountains areas, notably the north and Mount Olympus. Larissa is often the warmest area in Greece in summer and the coldest in winter. The highest temperature ever recorded was 45.4 °C (2000) and the coldest was -21.6 °C (1968). The city experiences very often temperatures over 40 °C.

== Administration ==
The regional unit Larissa is subdivided into 7 municipalities. These are (number as in the map in the infobox):

- Agia (2)
- Elassona (3)
- Farsala (7)
- Kileler (4)
- Larissa (Larisa, 1)
- Tempi (5)
- Tyrnavos (6)

=== Prefecture ===
Larissa was created as a prefecture (Greek: Νομός Λάρισας) in 1882. As a part of the 2011 Kallikratis government reform, the regional unit Larissa was created out of the former prefecture Larissa. The prefecture had the same territory as the present regional unit. At the same time, the municipalities were reorganised, according to the table below.

New municipality	Old municipalities	Seat
Agia	Agia	Agia
Agia	Evrymenes	Agia
Agia	Lakereia	Agia
Agia	Melivoia	Agia
Elassona	Elassona	Elassona
Elassona	Antichasia	Elassona
Elassona	Verdikoussa	Elassona
Elassona	Karya	Elassona
Elassona	Livadi	Elassona
Elassona	Olympos	Elassona
Elassona	Potamia	Elassona
Elassona	Sarantaporo	Elassona
Elassona	Tsaritsani	Elassona
Farsala	Farsala	Farsala
Farsala	Enippeas	Farsala
Farsala	Narthaki	Farsala
Farsala	Polydamantas	Farsala
Kileler	Kileler	Nikaia
Kileler	Armenio	Nikaia
Kileler	Krannonas	Nikaia
Kileler	Nikaia	Nikaia
Kileler	Platykampos	Nikaia
Larissa (Larisa)	Larissa	Larissa
Larissa (Larisa)	Giannouli	Larissa
Larissa (Larisa)	Koilada	Larissa
Tempi	Makrychori	Makrychori
Tempi	Ampelakia	Makrychori
Tempi	Gonnoi	Makrychori
Tempi	Kato Olympos	Makrychori
Tempi	Nessonas	Makrychori
Tyrnavos	Tyrnavos	Tyrnavos
Tyrnavos	Ampelonas	Tyrnavos

=== Historical Provinces ===
- Province of Larissa (Larissa)
- Province of Tyrnavos (Tyrnavos)
- Province of Agia (Agia)
- Province of Elassona (Elassona)
- Province of Farsala (Farsala)

Note: Provinces no longer hold any legal status in Greece, they were abolished in 2006.

== History ==
The area of Larissa was home to the Pelasgians until they merged into the broader Greek culture. The area was invaded and was ruled by the Kingdom of Macedonia a few centuries later, and was conquered by the Roman Republic after the Third Macedonian War. The Roman imperial period was followed by Byzantine rule, which was in turn succeeded by the Ottoman Empire. Parts of Thessaly revolted during the Greek War of Independence, but Thessaly remained under Ottoman Turkish rule. It was awarded to Greece in the Congress of Berlin in 1878, and finally incorporated into the Hellenic Kingdom in 1881, albeit parts of the modern Larissa prefecture, including Tyrnavos, Elassona and Sarantaporo, remained Ottoman. During the Greco-Turkish War of 1897, the area was successfully invaded by the Ottomans, but in the end Greece conceded only minor territorial losses. The northern portions of the prefecture, the Tempe Valley and Mount Olympus, were taken by Greece during the First Balkan War in 1912-1913.

The economy increased since the annexation in 1881 and later after 1913 for the north. After the Greco-Turkish War in Asia Minor of 1920-1922, refugees were relocated to the Prefecture. Several villages were created for them across the prefecture. During World War II, the area was a major scene of partisan activity. The occupation and the subsequent Greek Civil War however destroyed most of the local infrastructure. From the 1950s on, the road network was significantly expanded: the EO1 was opened in 1957 and extended in the 1960s to the Tempe Valley. In 1984, the University of Thessaly opened its doors.

== Economy ==
Its main economy since the 1970s are manufacturing, businesses, communications and services. Agriculture is the second leading industry.

=== Agriculture ===
The Thessalian Plain is famous for its crops including fruits (watermelon and melon), vegetables (tomatoes, potatoes, cucumbers, onions, etc.), cotton, dairy, cattle and other crops.

== Communications ==
=== Television ===
- TRT
- Thessaly

=== Newspapers ===
- Agrotikoi Ekfasi - Larissa
- I Alitheia - Farsala
- Eleftheria - Larissa
- I Foni - Farsala
- Imerisios Kirykas - Larissa
- Ta Nea tis Farsalou - Farsala

== Transport ==
The Piraeus–Platy and Larissa–Volos railways pass through the regional unit, meeting at Larissa: the Tempi train crash occurred in the regional unit, north of Evangelismos, while the railways in the region were severely disrupted by Storm Daniel in 2023.

Since Larissa is a major Greek city, there are many main roads in the regional unit, including: the A1 motorway, part of European route E75; the EO1a and Larissa Southern Bypass national roads, which bypass Larissa to the south; the EO1, EO3, EO6, EO13, EO26 and EO30 national roads; Larissa Provincial Road 1, from Larissa to Agiokampos; and the Larissa–Karditsa road corridor, part of Karditsa Provincial Road 17 and Larissa Provincial Road 28. The EO28 is a short military airport national road from Larissa to Larissa National Airport, a military air base.

== Sports ==
Sporting clubs include:

- Athletic Union of Larissa 1964
- Athlitiki Enosi Larissa F.C. - the only football team in Greece that ever won a championship other than the teams from Athens and Thessaloniki.
- Olympia Larissa BC
- AEL 1964 BC

== See also ==
- List of settlements in the Larissa regional unit
