= Petroto =

Petroto (Greek: Πετρωτό) may refer to several places in Greece:

- Petroto, Achaea, a village in Achaea
- Petroto, Karditsa, the site of the ancient village Pereia, Phthiotis, ancient Thessaly
- Petroto, Larissa, a village in Elassona
- Petroto, Phthiotis, a village in Phthiotis
- Petroto, Trikala, a village in Oichalia, Trikala
- Petroto, Thessaloniki, a village in Thessaloniki regional unit
- Petroto, a village in Platanos, Aetolia-Acarnania
