= Lofos =

Lofos (Greek: Λόφος, "hill") may refer to several settlements in Greece:

- Lofos, Achaea, a village in Aigialeia
- Lofos, Chania, a village in Kantanos-Selino
- Lofos, Elassona, a village and a community in Elassona
- Lofos, Farsala, a village in Farsala
- Lofos, Pieria, a village and a community in Katerini
