= Kallithea Elassonos =

Kallithea Elassonos Καλλιθέα Ελασσόνος
- Community
- Location within Greece
- Coordinates: 39°58.8′N 22°11.4′E
- Country: Greece
- Administrative region: Thessaly
- Regional unit: Larissa
- Municipality: Elassona
- Municipal unit: Olympos

Area
  - Community: 30.437 km^{2} (11.752 sq mi)
- Elevation: 515 m (1,690 ft)

Population (2021)
  - Community: 617
  - Density: 20.3/km^{2} (52.5/sq mi)
- Time zone: UTC+2 (EET)
  - Summer (DST): UTC+3 (EEST)
- Postal code: 402 00
- Area code: +30-2493
- Vehicle registration: PI

Kallithea Elassonos (Greek: Καλλιθέα Ελασσόνος, Greek pronunciation: [kali'θea ela'sonos]), known before 1927 as Sadovo (Greek: Σάντοβο), is a village and a community of the Elassona municipality. Before the 2011 local government reform it was a part of the municipality of Olympos. The community of Kallithea Elassonos covers an area of 30.437 km^{2}.

== Administrative division ==
The community of Kallithea Elassonos consists of two settlements:

- Kallithea
- Petroto

== Population ==
Historical population
Year	Pop.	±%
2001	738	—
2011	699	−5.3%
2021	617	−11.7%

== Geography ==
Kallithea Elassonos is situated at an elevation above 500 m in a plain southwest of Greece's tallest mountain, Mount Olympus. It is 10 km north of Elassona, 42 km southwest of Katerini, 44 km northwest of Larissa, and 49 km southeast of Kozani. The Greek National Road 13 (Elassona – Katerini) passes west of the village.

== See also ==
- List of settlements in the Larissa regional unit
