= Flampouro =

Flampouro (Greek: Φλάμπουρο) may refer to several places in Greece:

- Flampouro, Florina, a village in the Florina regional unit
- Flampouro, Larissa, a village in the Larissa regional unit
- Flampouro, Serres, a village in the Serres regional unit
