= Olympos, Larissa =

Olympos Όλυμπος
- Municipal unit
- Location within the regional unit

- Location within Greece
- Coordinates: 39°59′N 22°12′E
- Country: Greece
- Administrative region: Thessaly
- Regional unit: Larissa
- Municipality: Elassona

Area
  - Municipal unit: 303.96 km^{2} (117.36 sq mi)
- Highest elevation: 2,911 m (9,551 ft)
- Lowest elevation: 400 m (1,300 ft)

Population (2021)
  - Municipal unit: 2,463
  - Municipal unit density: 8.103/km^{2} (20.99/sq mi)
- Time zone: UTC+2 (EET)
  - Summer (DST): UTC+3 (EEST)
- Postal code: 402 00
- Vehicle registration: ΡΙ

Olympos (Greek: Όλυμπος) is a former municipality in the Larissa regional unit, Thessaly, Greece. Since the 2011 local government reform it is part of the municipality Elassona, of which it is a municipal unit. The municipal unit has an area of 303.964 km^{2}. The seat of the municipality was in Kallithea. The municipality was named after the nation's highest point, Mount Olympus.

== Subdivisions ==
The municipal unit Olympos is subdivided into the following communities (constituent villages in brackets):

- Flampouro (Flampouro, Skopia, Iera Moni Sparmou)
- Kallithea Elassonos (Kallithea, Petroto)
- Kokkinogeio
- Kokkinopilos (Kokkinopilos, Kalyvia)
- Lofos (Lofos, Asprochoma)
- Olympiada (Olympiada, Sparmos)
- Pythio

== Population ==
Historical population
Year	Pop.	±%
1991	4,410	—
2001	3,446	−21.9%
2011	3,164	−8.2%
2021	2,463	−22.2%

== Geography ==
The municipality is mountainous, especially in the northeastern part, where Greece's tallest point, Mount Olympus, is situated. The village Kallithea is situated in the lower southwestern part, which is characterised by small rivers and farmlands. The Greek National Road 13 (Elassona - Katerini) passes through the municipal unit. Elassona lies south of Olympos, and the Pieria regional unit lies to the northeast.
