= Asprochoma =

Asprochoma may refer to the following villages in Greece:

- Asprochoma, Ioannina, part of the municipality Zitsa
- Asprochoma, Messenia, part of the municipality Kalamata
- Asprochoma, Larissa, part of the municipality Elassona
