= Kokkinogeio =

Kokkinogeio Κοκκινόγειο
- Community
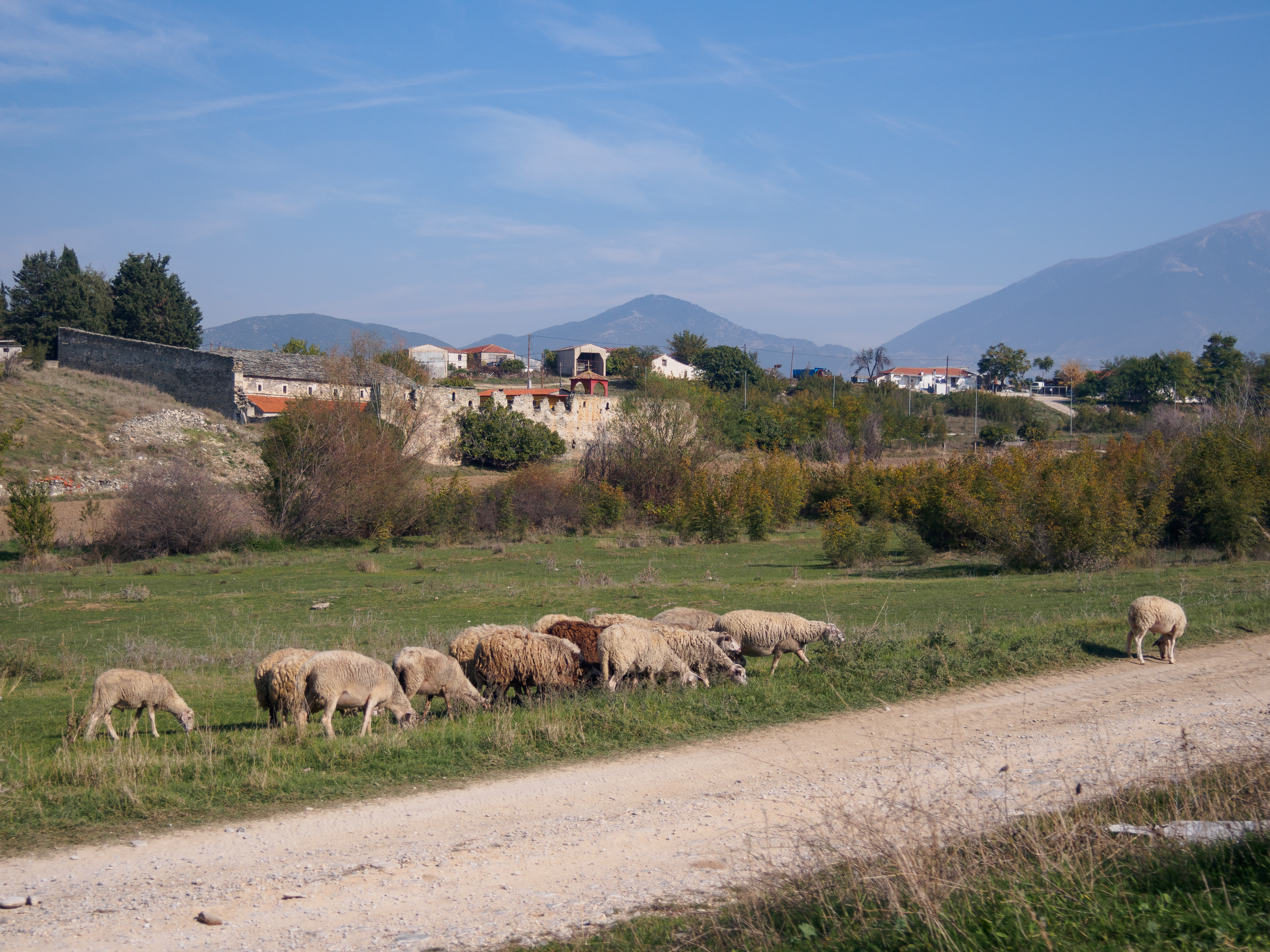
- View of Kokkinogeio

- Location within Greece
- Coordinates: 40°2′N 22°9.9′E
- Country: Greece
- Administrative region: Thessaly
- Regional unit: Larissa
- Municipality: Elassona
- Municipal unit: Olympos

Area
  - Community: 9.902 km^{2} (3.823 sq mi)
- Elevation: 540 m (1,770 ft)

Population (2021)
  - Community: 185
  - Density: 18.7/km^{2} (48.4/sq mi)
- Time zone: UTC+2 (EET)
  - Summer (DST): UTC+3 (EEST)
- Postal code: 402 00
- Area code: +30-2493
- Vehicle registration: PI

Kokkinogeio (Greek: Κοκκινόγειο, Greek pronunciation: [koci'noʝio]) is a village and a community of the Elassona municipality. Before the 2011 local government reform it was a part of the municipality of Olympos, of which it was a municipal district. The community of Kokkinogeio covers an area of 9.902 km^{2}.

== History ==
The settlement is recorded as a village with two names in the Ottoman tahrir defter (number 101) of 1521; Timurlu and Topolyana. Later during the Ottoman Era, the village became a Turkish-owned chiflik, and was known locally as Demirádes (Δεμιράδες).

== Population ==
Historical population
Year	Pop.	±%
2001	315	—
2011	240	−23.8%
2021	185	−22.9%

== See also ==
- List of settlements in the Larissa regional unit
