= Sparmos =

Sparmos Σπαρμός
- Settlement
- Location within Greece
- Coordinates: 39°59.2′N 22°15.7′E
- Country: Greece
- Administrative region: Thessaly
- Regional unit: Larissa
- Municipality: Elassona
- Municipal unit: Olympos
- Community: Olympiada
- Elevation: 580 m (1,900 ft)

Population (2021)
  - Total: 105
- Time zone: UTC+2 (EET)
  - Summer (DST): UTC+3 (EEST)
- Postal code: 402 00
- Area code: +30-2493
- Vehicle registration: PI

Sparmos (Greek: Σπαρμός, Greek pronunciation: [spaɾ'mos]) is a village of the Elassona municipality. Before the 2011 local government reform it was a part of the municipality of Olympos. Sparmos is a part of the community of Olympiada.

== History ==
The settlement is recorded as village and as "Isparmo" in the Ottoman Tahrir Defter number 367 dating to 1530.

== Population ==
Historical population
Year	Pop.	±%
2001	135	—
2011	126	−6.7%
2021	105	−16.7%

== See also ==
- List of settlements in the Larissa regional unit
- Agia Triada Monastery, Sparmos
