= Mount Olympus =

Highest mountain in Greece

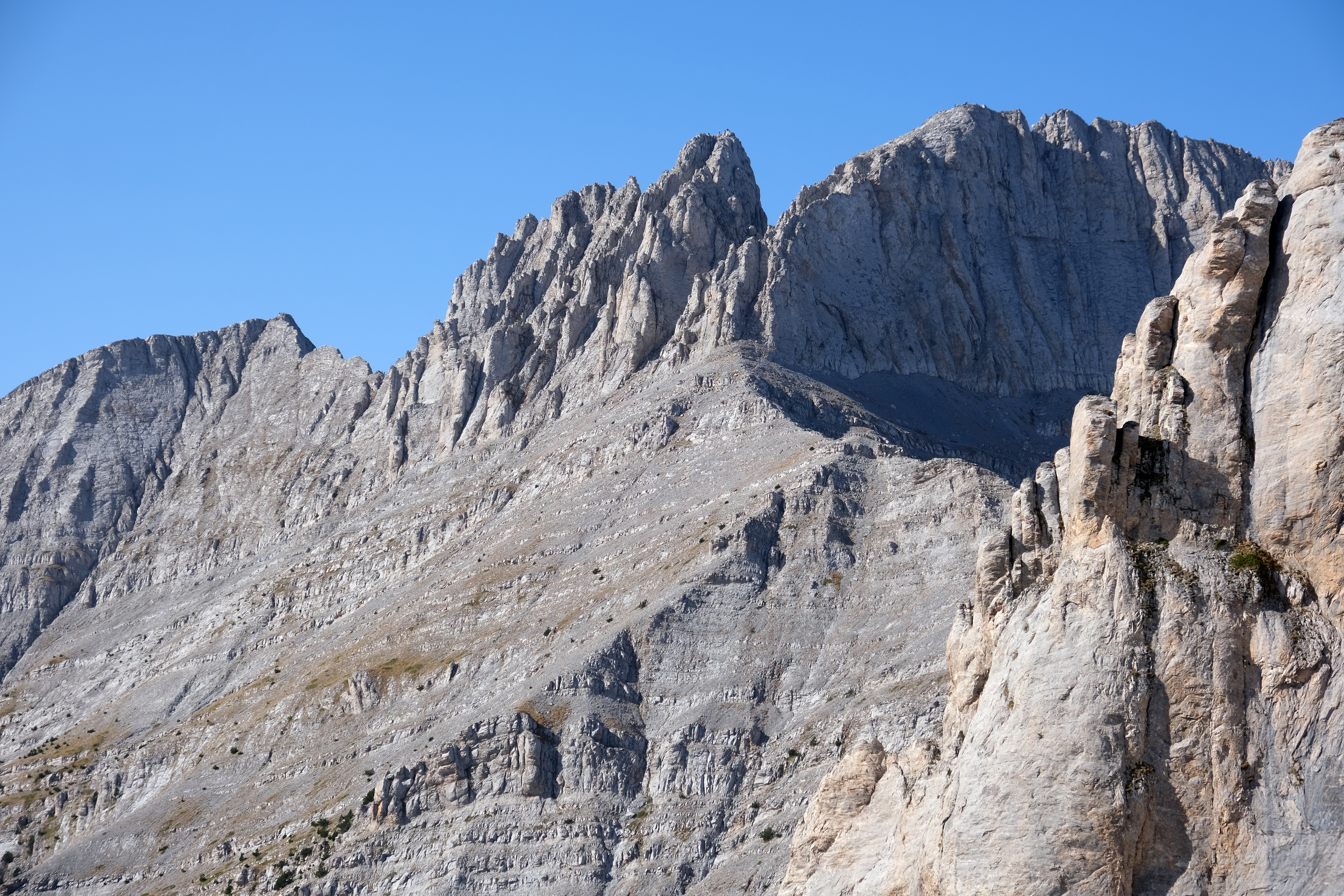
- Mount Olympus's peaks in daytime

Highest point
- Peak: Mytikas
- Elevation: 2,917.727 m (9,572.60 ft)
- Prominence: 2,353 m (7,720 ft)
- Listing: Country high point Ultra
- Coordinates: 40°05′08″N 22°21′31″E

Geography
- Location within Greece
- Location: Greece
- Parent range: Thessaly and Macedonia, near the Thermaic Gulf

Climbing
- First ascent: By religious pilgrims or priests in Antiquity. First Modern Ascent: 2 August 1913; Christos Kakkalos, Frederic Boissonnas and Daniel Baud-Bovy

UNESCO World Heritage Site
- Official name: Wider Area of Mount Olympus
- Criteria: Mixed: vi, x
- Reference: 1719
- Inscription: 2026 (48th Session)

Mount Olympus (/oʊˈlɪmpəs, əˈlɪm-/, Greek: Όλυμπος, romanized: Ólympos, IPA: [ˈoli(m)bos]) is an extensive massif near the Thermaic Gulf of the Aegean Sea, in Greece, located on the border between Thessaly and Macedonia, between the regional units of Larissa and Pieria, about 80 km (50 mi) southwest from Thessaloniki. Mount Olympus has 52 peaks and deep gorges. The highest peak, Mytikas (Μύτικας Mýtikas), meaning "nose", rises to 2,917.727 metres (9,572.60 ft) and is the highest peak in Greece, and one of the highest peaks in Europe in terms of topographic prominence.

In Greek mythology, Olympus is the home of the Greek gods. The mountain has exceptional biodiversity and rich flora. It has been a National Park, the first in Greece, since 1938. It is also a World Biosphere Reserve. In July 2026, the wider area of Mount Olympus was inscribed on the UNESCO World Heritage List as a mixed World Heritage Site, in recognition of its natural and cultural significance.

Olympus remains the most popular hiking summit in Greece, as well as one of the most popular in Europe. Organized mountain refuges and various mountaineering and climbing routes are available. The usual starting point is the town of Litochoro which lies in the eastern foothills of the mountain, some 100 km (62 mi) from Thessaloniki.

== Geography ==
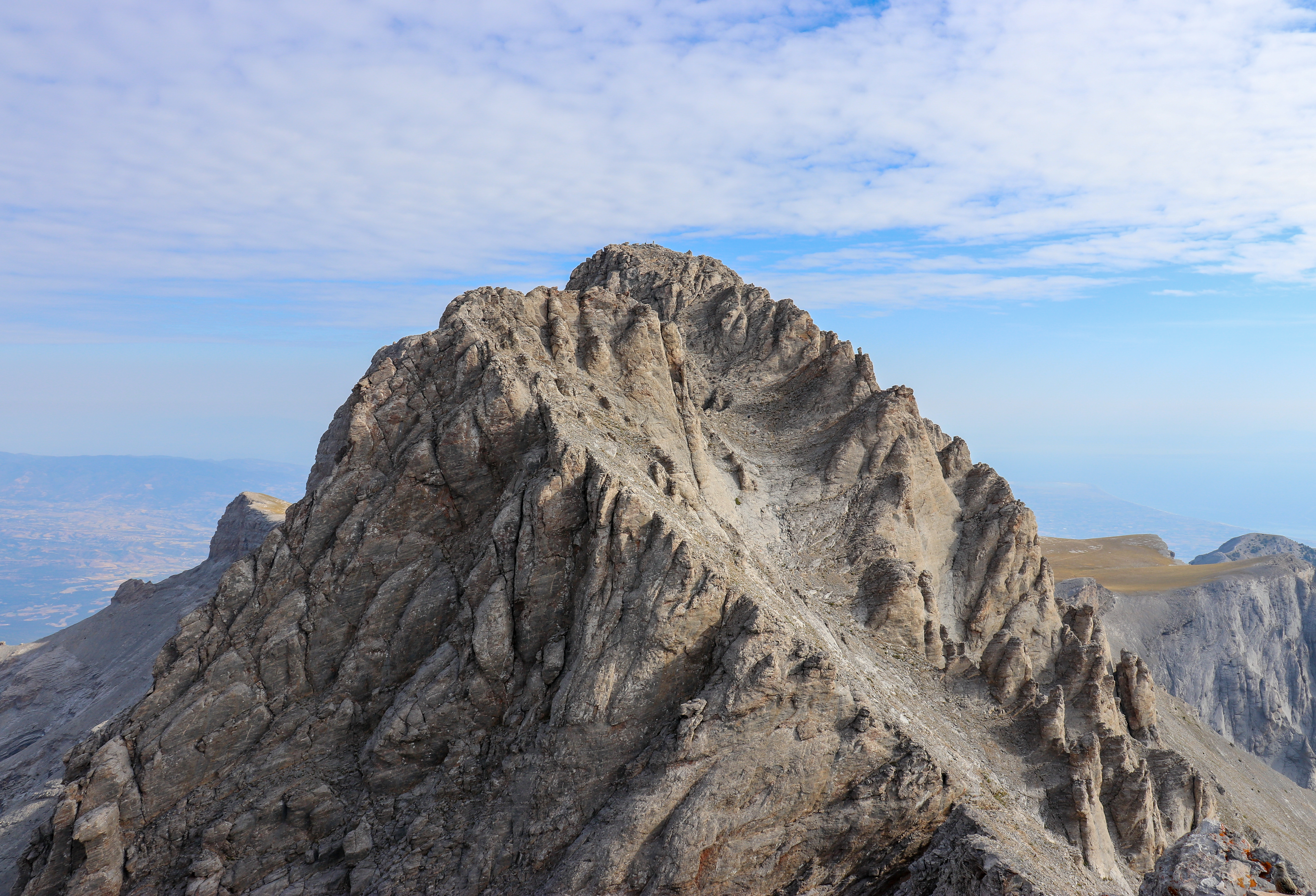
Mytikas: the highest peak

The shape of Olympus was formed by rain and wind, which produced an isolated tower almost 3,000 metres (9,800 ft) above the sea, which is only 18 kilometres (11 mi) away from Litochoro. Olympus has many peaks and an almost circular shape. The mountain has a circumference of 80 kilometres (50 mi), an average diameter of 26 kilometres (16 mi), and 500 square kilometres (190 mi^{2}) of area. To the northwest lies the Aromanian village of Kokkinopilos. The Makryrema stream separates Olympus from the massif of Voulgara. The villages Petra, Vrontou and Dion lie to the northeast, while on the eastern side there is the town of Litochoro, where Enipeas bisects the massif of Olympus. On its southeastern side, the Ziliana gorge divides Mount Olympus from Kato Olympos (Lower Olympus), while on its southwestern foothills, there are the villages Sykaminea and Karya. The Agia Triada Sparmou Monastery and the village Pythion lie to the west.

Olympus's dry foothills, known as the Xirokampi, are covered in maquis shrubland and provide habitat for animals such as wild boar. Further east, the plain of Dion is fertile and watered by the streams which originate on Olympus.

== Geology ==
Mount Olympus is formed of sedimentary rock laid down 200 million years ago in a shallow sea. Various geological events that followed caused the emergence of the whole region and the sea. Around one million years ago, glaciers covered Olympus and created its plateaus and depressions. With the temperature rise that followed, the ice melted and the streams that were created swept away large quantities of crushed rock in the lowest places, forming the alluvial fans, that spread out all over the region from the foothills of the mountain to the sea. The Geological Museum of Mount Olympus, located in Leptokarya, provides detailed information about the geological structure of the mountain.

== Morphology ==
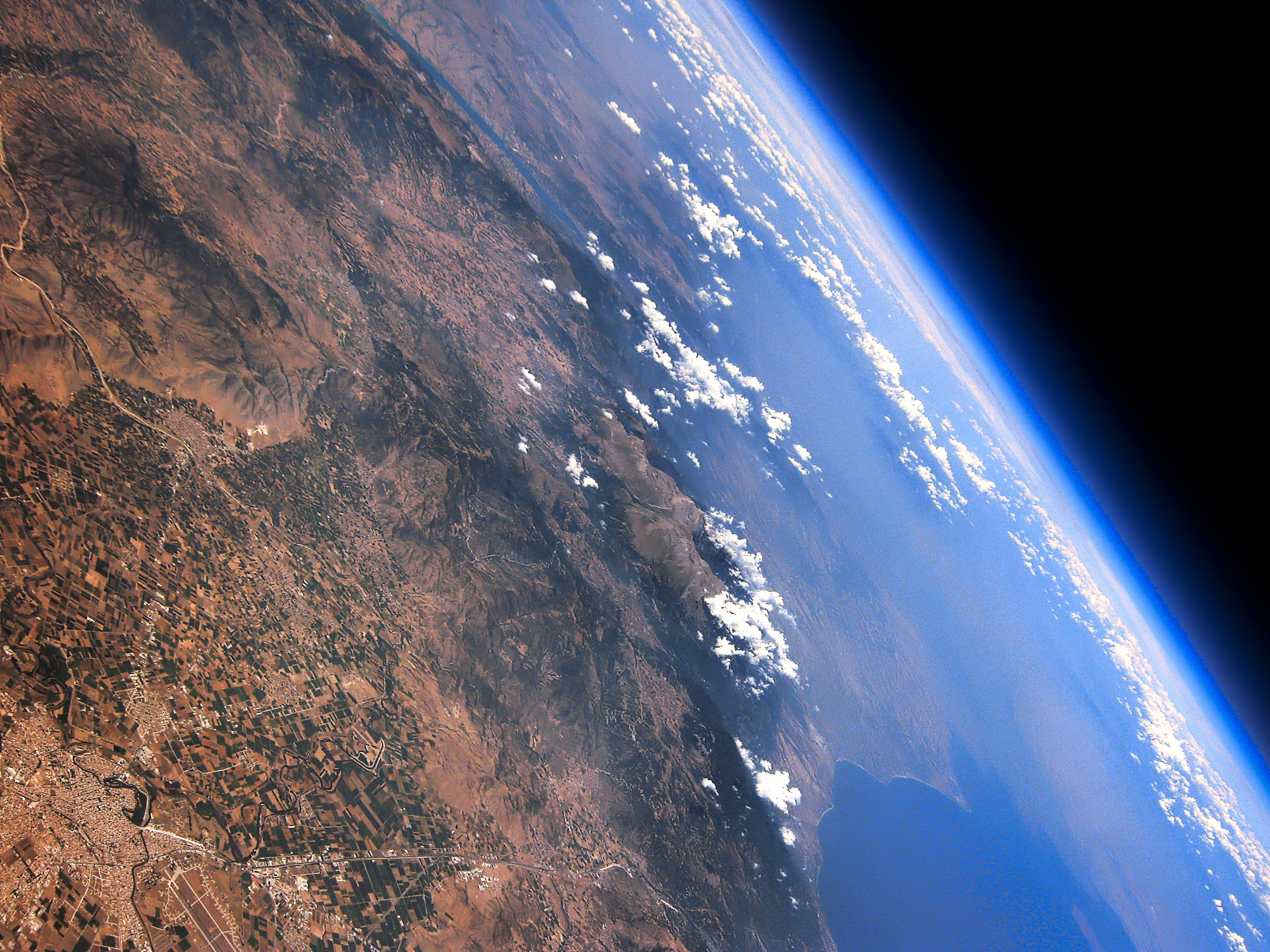
Stratospheric view of Mount Olympus

The complicated geological past of the region is obvious from the morphology of Olympus and its National Park. Features include deep gorges and lots of smooth peaks, many of them over 2,000 metres (6,600 ft), including Aghios Antonios (2,815 metres (9,236 ft)), Kalogeros (2,700 metres (8,900 ft)), Toumpa (2,801 metres (9,190 ft)) and Profitis Ilias (2,803 metres (9,196 ft)). However, it is the central, almost vertical, rocky peaks, that impress the visitor. Over the town of Litochoro, on the horizon, the relief of the mountain displays an apparent "V", between two peaks of almost equal height. The left limb is the peak named Mytikas (or Pantheon). It is Greece's highest peak. Then, on the right is Stefani (or Thronos Dios [Throne of Zeus – 2,911.11 metres (9,550.9 ft)]), which presents the most impressive and steep peak of Olympus, with its last sharply rising 200 metres presenting the greatest challenge for climbers. Further south, Skolio (40.0829°N 22.3571°E second highest sub-peak – 2,905.2 metres (9,531 ft)) completes an arc of about 200 degrees, with its steep slopes forming on the west side, like a wall, an impressive precipitous amphitheatrical cavity, 700 metres (2,300 ft) in depth and 1,000 metres (3,300 ft) in circumference, the 'Megala Kazania'. On the east side of the high peaks the steep slopes form zone like parallel folds, the 'Zonaria'. Even narrower and steeper scorings, the 'Loukia', lead to the peak.

On the north side, between Stefani and Profitis Ilias, extends the Muses' Plateau, at 2,550 metres (8,370 ft), while further south, almost in the center of the massif, extends the alpine tundra region of Bara, at an elevation of 2,350 metres (7,710 ft). Olympus has numerous ravines and gullies. Most distinguishable of the ravines are those of Mavrologos-Enipeas (14 km) and Mavratzas-Sparmos (13 km) near Bara and 'cut' the massif in two oval portions. On the southern foothills the great gorge of Ziliana, 13 km long, consists of a natural limit that separates the mountain from Lower Olympus. There are also many precipices and a number of caves, even nowadays unexplored. The form and layout of the rocks favor the emergence of numerous springs, most of them lower than 2,000 m, small seasonal lakes and streams and a small river, Enipeas, with its springs in the site Prionia and its estuary in the Aegean Sea.

== Name and mythological associations ==
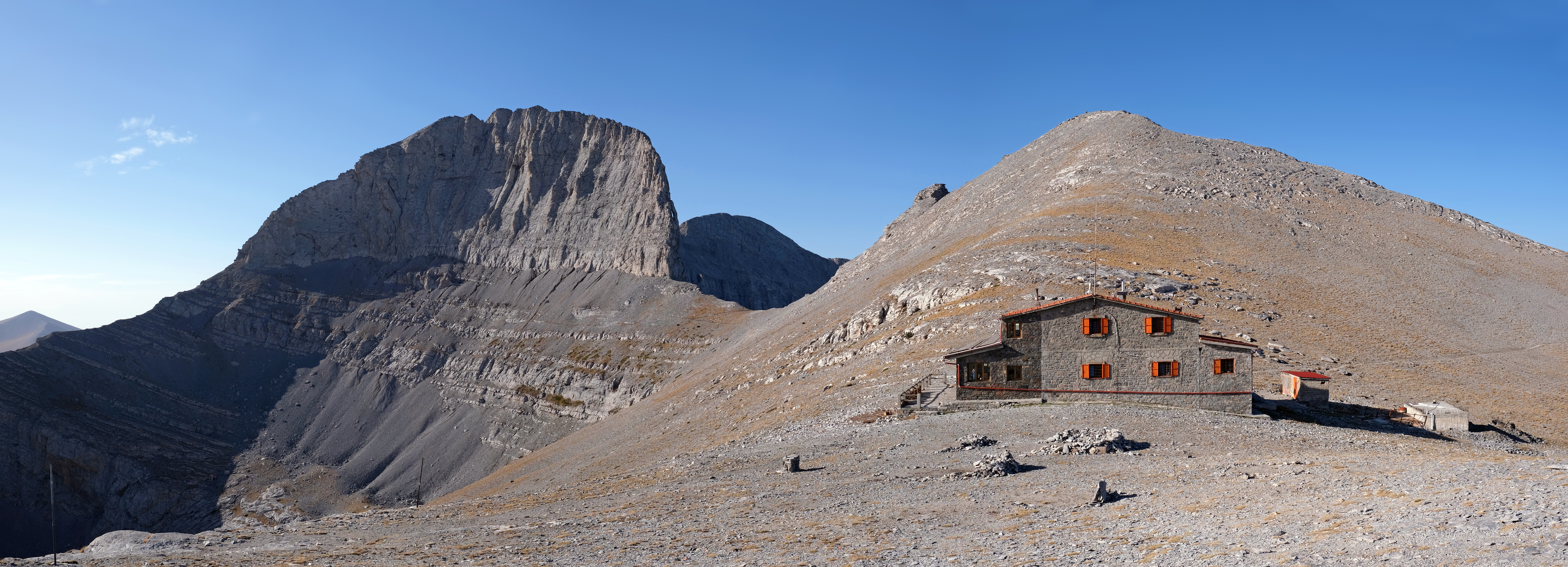
Muses' Plateau, with Stefani (the throne of Zeus) in the background

The origin of the name Όλυμπος (Olympos) is unknown. One theory suggests that it is compounded of ou lyma (οὐ λύμα) and pous (πούς), meaning "pure foot", conforming to Hesiod's description of the earth as a sort of footstool for heaven up from which rise the "Blessed Gods". According to Robert S.P. Beekes the word is of pre-Greek origin and he speculates that it originally meant "mountain". The word is also probably cognate with the Mycenean Greek word 𐀄𐀬𐀠𐀊𐀍 (u-ru-pi-ja-jo) which is, most likely, a term used to describe people, or possibly an ethnic group. In Homeric Greek (Odyssey 6.42), the variant Οὔλυμπος Oulumpos occurs, conceived of as the seat of the gods (and not identified with any specific peak). Homer (Iliad 5.754, Odyssey 20.103) also appears to be using οὔλυμπος as a common noun, as a synonym of οὐρανός ouranos "sky". Mount Olympus was historically also known as Mount Belus, after Iliad 1.591, where the seat of the gods is referred to as βηλὸς θεσπέσiος "heavenly threshold". (Note: ῥῖψε ποδὸς τεταγὼν ἀπὸ βηλοῦ θεσπεσίοιο "he [Zeus] caught me [Hepahistos] by the foot and flung me from the heavenly threshold." (trans. Butler 1898). In early modern literature, the name became associated with that of Belus, the legendary Assyrian king (from Assyro-Babylonian bel "lord, master"); see e.g. Algernon Herbert, Nimrod; a discourse upon certain passages of history and fable (1826).)

In Ancient Greek religion and mythology, "Olympus" was the name of the home of the Twelve Olympian gods. This was conceived of as a lofty mountaintop, and in all regions settled by Greek tribes, the highest local elevation tended to be so named; among the numerous peaks called Olumpos in antiquity are mountains in Mysia, Laconia, Lycia, Cyprus, Attica, Euboea, Ionia and Lesbos, and others. Thessalian Olympus is the highest peak in any territory settled by Greeks in antiquity and came to be seen as the "Pan-Hellenic" representative of the mythological seat of the gods, by at least the 5th century BC, as Herodotus (1.56) identifies Olympus as the peak in Thessaly.

In Pieria, at Olympus's northern foot, the mythological tradition had placed the nine Muses, patrons of the Fine Arts, daughters of Zeus and the Titaness Mnemosyne.

== History ==
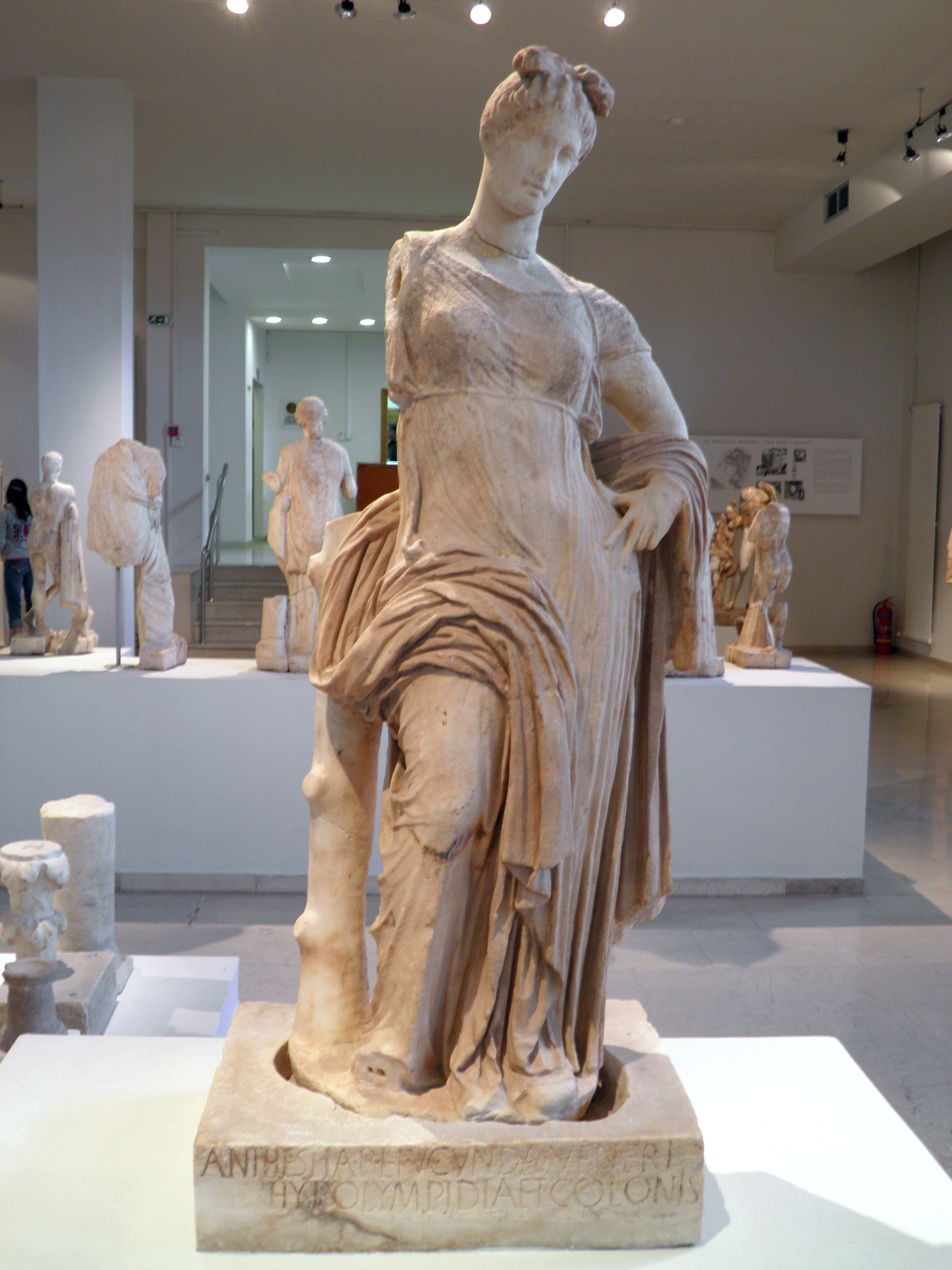
Aphrodite of Olympus statue (Archaeological Museum, Dion).

In antiquity, the Olympus massif formed the border between Thessaly and Macedon. The history of the surrounding area is consequently of interest in the context of the Rise of Macedon, the Chremonidean War and the Macedonian Wars during the 4th to 2nd centuries BC.

In the period of the Ottoman Empire the mountain was a hiding place and base of operations for klephts and armatoloi. In Olympus, the second armatoliki was founded, led by Kara Michalis in 1489. The action of the klephts in Olympus led the Turks to visit their outrage on the klephts' ally-village of Milia (in the late 17th century), which they destroyed. In that period Livadi in Olympus became the seat of the armatoliki of Olympus and Western Macedonia, with their first renowned commander Panos Zidros. In the 18th century the Turks had to replace the armatoloi (who very often joined the klephts) with Muslim Albanian armatoloi who ravaged the countryside of Macedonia. However, Olympus's armatoloi, even after their capitulation to Ali Pasha, never ceased fighting on land and at sea. Among them who were active there and in nearby regions were Nikotsaras, Giorgakis Olympios and the legendary family of Lazaioi. In the early 20th century, even for some time after the liberation from the Ottoman Empire (1912), robbers were active in the region – the best known of them the notorious Giagoulas (el), while during the German invasion in 1941 the Hellenic Army fought significant battles along with units of New Zealanders and Australians. During the German Occupation (1941–1944) the mountain was one of the centers of the Greek Resistance, while a little later the Greek Civil War (1946–49) started there, in Litochoro.

=== Ancient and medieval sites ===
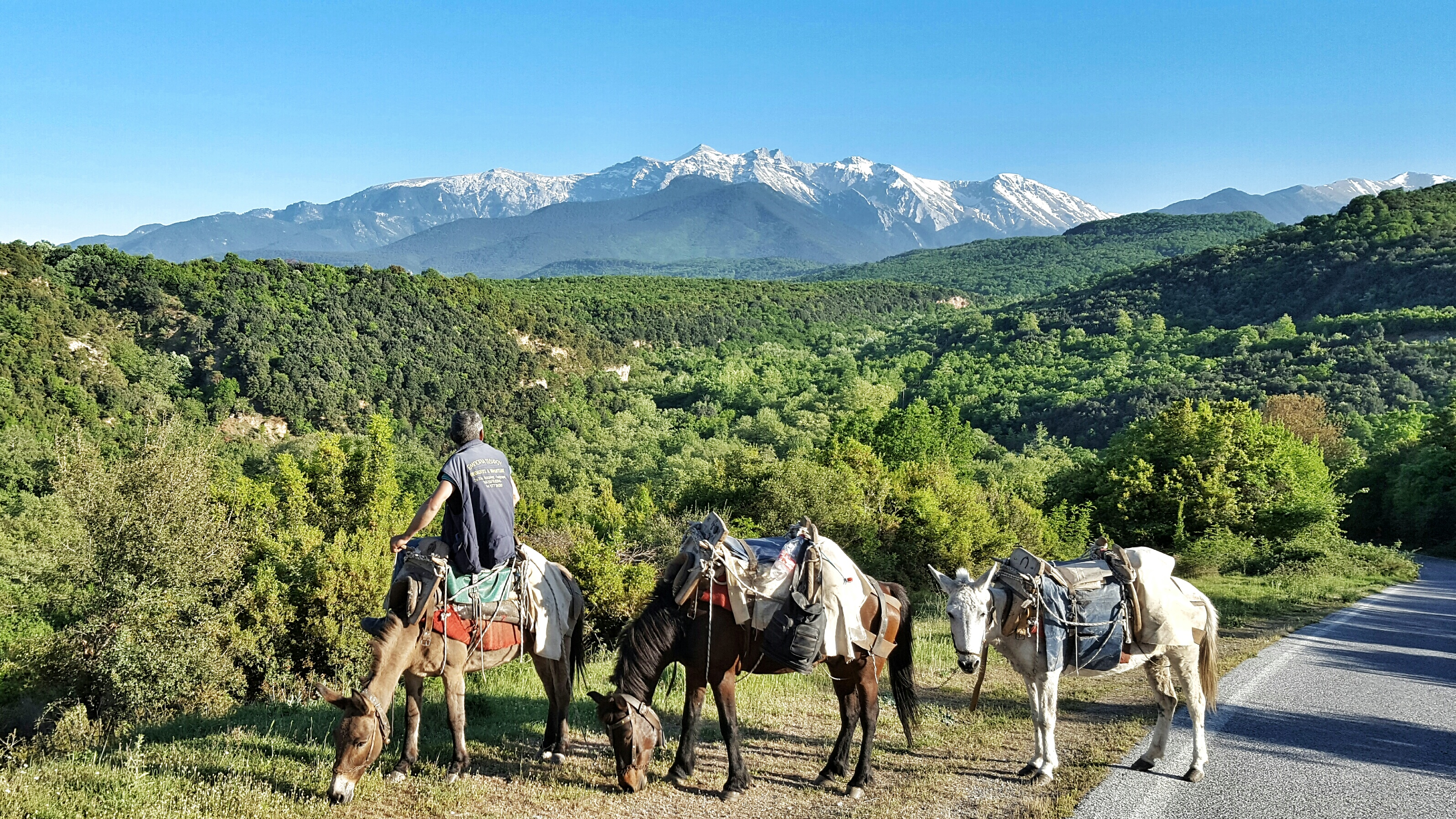
Mount Olympus as seen from north at Petra, Pieria

The whole region of Pieria's Olympus was declared an archaeological and historical site for the preservation of its monumental and historical character. Five kilometres away from the sea is Dion, sacred city of the ancient Makedones, dedicated to Zeus and the Twelve Olympians. Its prosperity lasted from the 5th century BC to the 5th century AD. The excavations, continuing since 1928, have revealed numerous findings of the Classical, the Hellenistic and the Roman period. Currently there is a unique archaeological park of 200 hectares, with the ancient town and the sacred places of worship, outside its walls. Many statues and other invaluable items are kept in the nearby Dion's archaeological museum.

Pimblia and Leivithra, two other towns in Olympus's region, are related to Orpheus and the "Orphic" mysteries. According to a tradition Orpheus, son of Apollo and Calliope (one of the Muses), taught here the mystic ceremonies of worship of Dionysus (also known as Bacchus). By the sea, in a strategic position, at Macedonia's gates is located Platamon Castle, built between 7th and 10th century AD in the ancient town of Heracleia. To the north the ancient Pydna is located. Here, in 168 BC, the decisive battle between the Macedonians and the Romans took place. Between Pydna and Mount Olympus are a fortified bishop's seat from the Byzantine period called Louloudies and the Macedonian Tombs of Katerini and Korinos.

=== Christian monuments ===
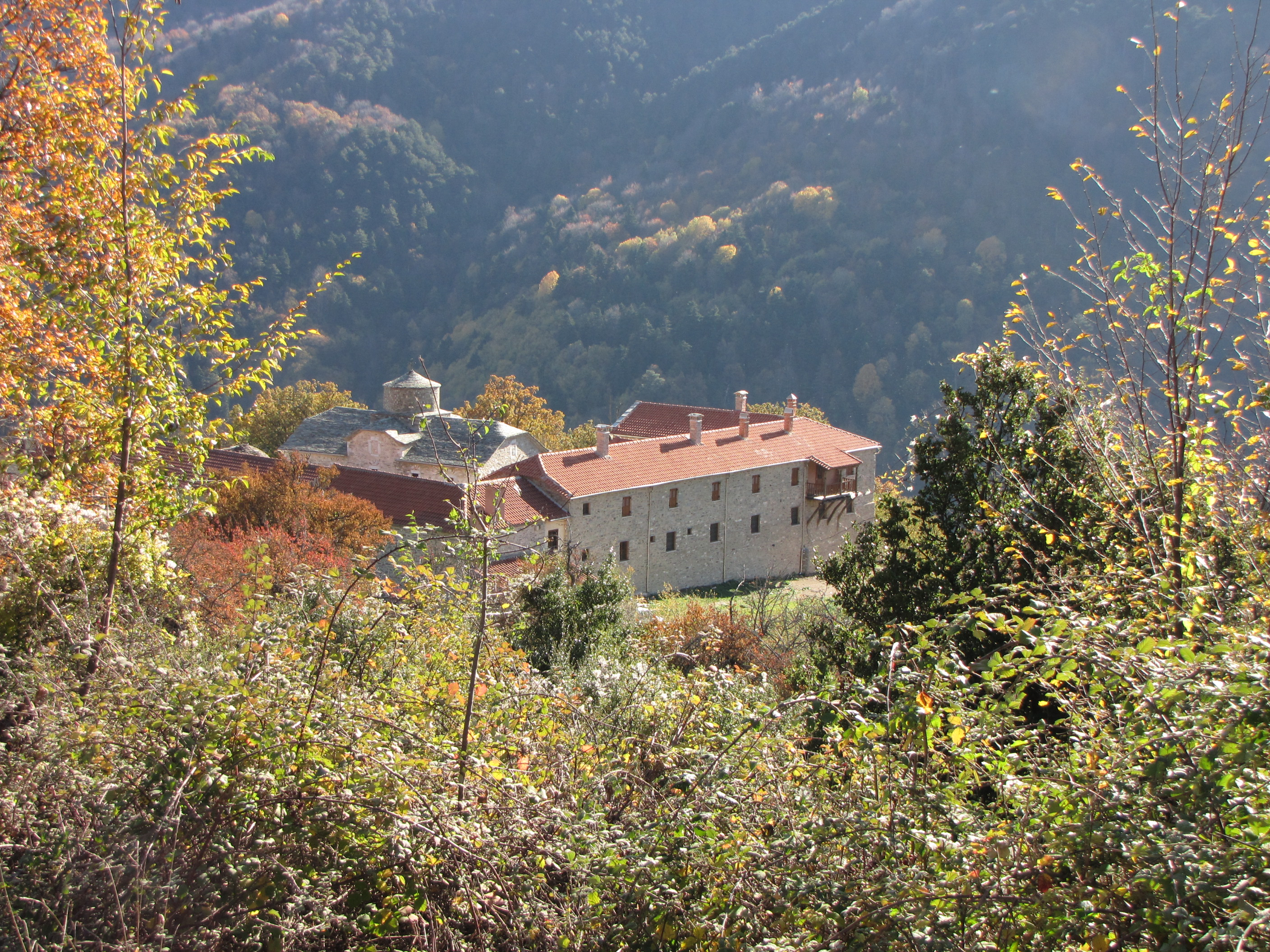
Monastery Kanalon

In the Olympus region, there are also several Christian monuments, among them the highest-elevation chapel of Orthodox Christianity, dedicated to Prophet Elias, in Greek tradition associated with mountaintops, on the summit of the same name (Προφήτης Ηλίας Profitis Ilias), at 2,803 m. It was built in the 16th century by Saint Dionysios of Olympus, who also founded the most significant monastery in the region. The Old Monastery of Dionysios (elevation 820 m) lies in Enipeas's gorge and is accessible by car from Litochoro. It was looted and burned by the Ottomans and in 1943 it was destroyed by the German invaders, who suspected it was a guerrilla den. Nowadays it has been partially restored and operates as a dependency of the New Monastery of Dionysios, that is outside Litochoro. On Olympus's southern foot, in a dominant position (820 m) in Ziliana gorge, there is the Kanalon Monastery, 8 km away from Karya. It was founded in 1055 by the monks Damianos and Joakim and since 2001 it has been restored and operates as a convent. Further west, in the edge of Mavratza stream, at 1,020 m, there is the Agia Triada Sparmou Monastery, that flourished in the early 18th century, possessed great property and assisted to establish the famous Tsaritsani' school. It was abandoned in 1932, but in 2000 it was completely renovated and reopened as a male monastery, affiliated to Elassona's diocese.

=== Climbing expeditions ===
Archaeological evidence suggests that Mount Olympus was regularly visited in religious pilgrimages through antiquity and the early Middle Ages. For instance, ancient Greek pottery, coins, and evidence of sacrificial ashes estimated to be from 400 B.C. have been found on the summit. Plutarch, writing during the Roman Empire, reported that writings and sacrificial ashes left by priests and religious pilgrims on the summit of the mountains of Mount Kyllini and Mount Olympus could be found intact several years later, being neither washed away by rains nor scattered by winds. Plutarch cited this as evidence that the highest mountains on Earth were above the clouds and winds. Augustine of Hippo, writing in the early Middle Ages, similarly reported in On Genesis that "on the peak of Mount Olympus, which is said to rise above the area of this humid air, we are told, certain letters are regularly made in the dust and are a year later found whole and unmarred by those who climb that mountain for their solemn memorials."

The third highest peak of Mount Olympus, called Agios Antonios (Άγιος Αντώνιος "Saint Anthony", 40.0677°N 22.3511°E, 2,817 m), is known to have been the site of a sanctuary of Zeus in antiquity based on archaeological finds discovered in 1961. In the modern era, a series of explorers tried to study the mountain and to reach its summit. Examples include the French archaeologist Leon Heuzey (1855), the German explorer Heinrich Barth (1862), and the German engineer Edward Richter. Richter tried to reach the summit in 1911 but was abducted by klephts, who also killed the Ottoman gendarmes that accompanied him.

It was just one year after the liberation of northern Greece from Ottoman rule, on 2 August 1913, that the summit of Olympus was finally reached. The Swiss Frédéric Boissonnas and Daniel Baud-Bovy, aided by a hunter of wild goats from Litochoro, Christos Kakkalos, were the first to reach Greece's highest peak. Kakkalos, who had much experience climbing Olympus, was the first of the three to climb Mytikas. Afterwards, and until his death in 1976, he was the official guide on Olympus. In 1921, he and Marcel Kurz reached the second highest summit of Olympus, Stefani. Based on these explorations, Kurz in 1923 edited Le Mont Olympe, a book that includes the first detailed map of the summits. In 1928, the painter Vasilis Ithakisios climbed Olympus together with Kakkalos, reaching a cave that he named Shelter of the Muses, and he spent many summers painting views of the mountain. Olympus was later photographed and mapped in detail by others, and a series of successful climbs and winter ascents of the steepest summits in difficult weather conditions took place.

Climbing Mount Olympus is a non-technical hike, except for the final section from the Skala summit to the Mytikas peak, which is a YDS class 3 rock scramble and due to high exposure to heights, requires resistance to acrophobia. It is estimated that over 10,000 people visit Mount Olympus each year, most of them reaching only the Skala and Skolio summits. Most climbs of Mount Olympus start from the town of Litochoro, which took the name City of Gods because of its location at the foot of the mountain. From there a road leads to Prionia, where the hike begins at the bottom of the mountain.

== Climate ==
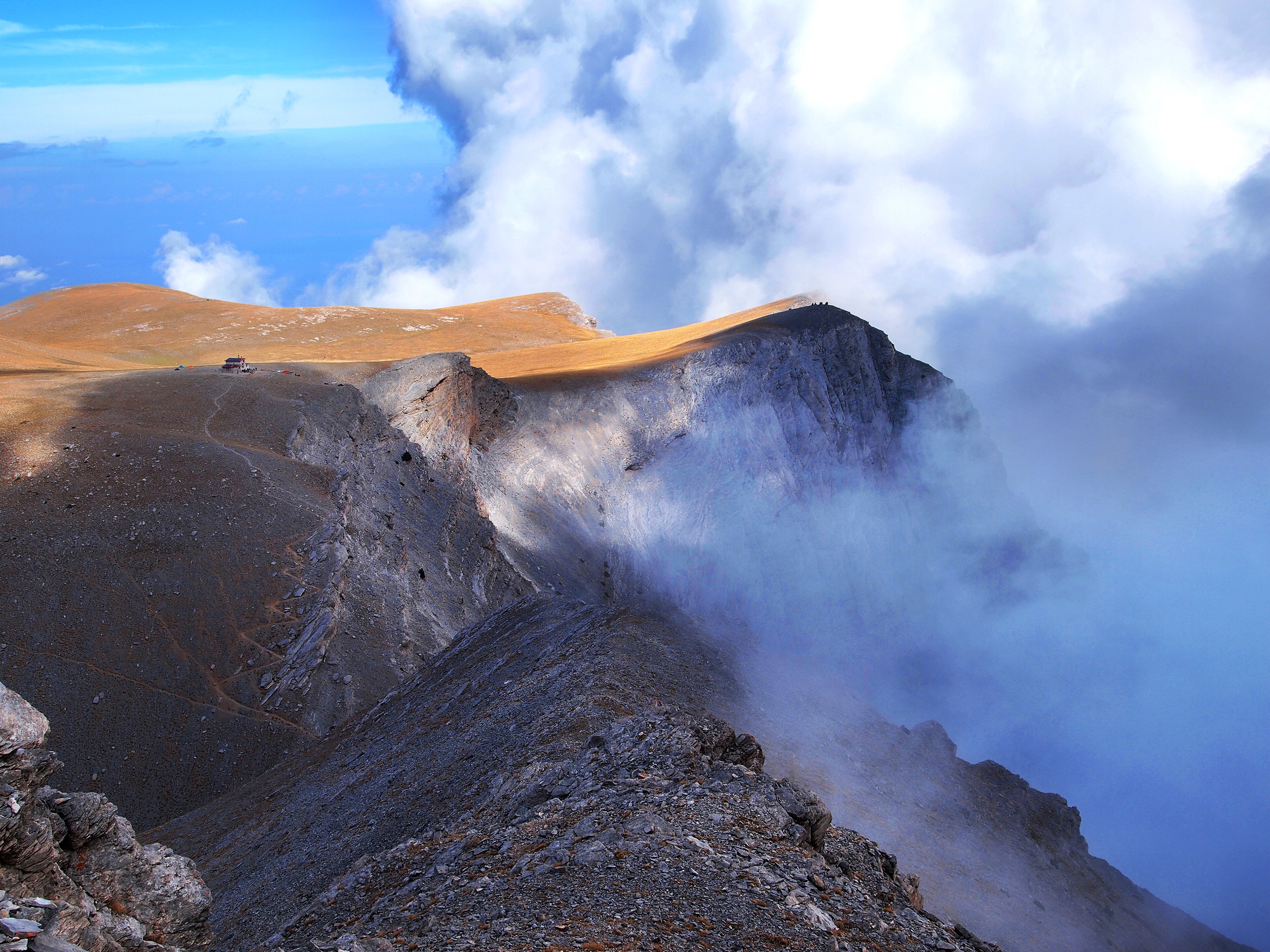
Christos Kakalos refuge and Profitis Ilias peak

Generally speaking Olympus's climate can be described as Mediterranean with continental influence. Its local variations are the result of the impact of the sea and the rugged terrain of the region. In the lower locations (Litochoro and the foothills) the climate is typically Mediterranean, i.e. hot and dry in the summer, but humid and cold in the winter. Higher it is more humid, warm and sometimes severe, with more intense meteorological phenomena; in these locations it often snows throughout winter, while rain and snow is not unusual even in the summer. The temperature varies in winter from −10 °C to 10 °C and in summer from 0 °C to 20 °C, while winds are an almost daily occurrence. Generally the temperature falls 1 °C per 200 m of elevation. As the elevation rises, meteorological phenomena are more intense and the changes in temperature and humidity are often sudden.

The coastal northeast slopes of Olympus receive more rain than the continental northwest, so, as a result, there is a clear difference in vegetation, being more abundant in the first of them. The hottest month is August, while the coldest is February.

The mountain's highest zone, over 2,000 metres, is snowcapped for about nine months (September to May). In some places the winds gather snow, 8–10 metres thick (anemosouria in Greek), while in some deep ravines the snow is maintained all over the year (everlasting snow). For this Olympus's alpine region, recordings have been made in the 1960s in the highest-elevation weather station in Greece, that was established on the summit of Aghios Antonios (2,815 m), providing a number of interesting data for the mountain's climate.

The average temperature is −5 °C in winter and 10 °C in summer. The average annual precipitation heights vary from 149 cm at Prionia (1,100 m) to 170 cm at Aghios Antonios, about half of them rainfall and hailstorms in summer and the rest snowfall in winter. The weather may change several times in the same day. In summer rainfalls are frequent, commonly as evening thunderstorms, many times accompanied by hail and strong winds. However water springs over 2,000 metres are scarce and visitors should ensure that they have always water and of course the necessary clothing for any weather conditions.

== Flora ==
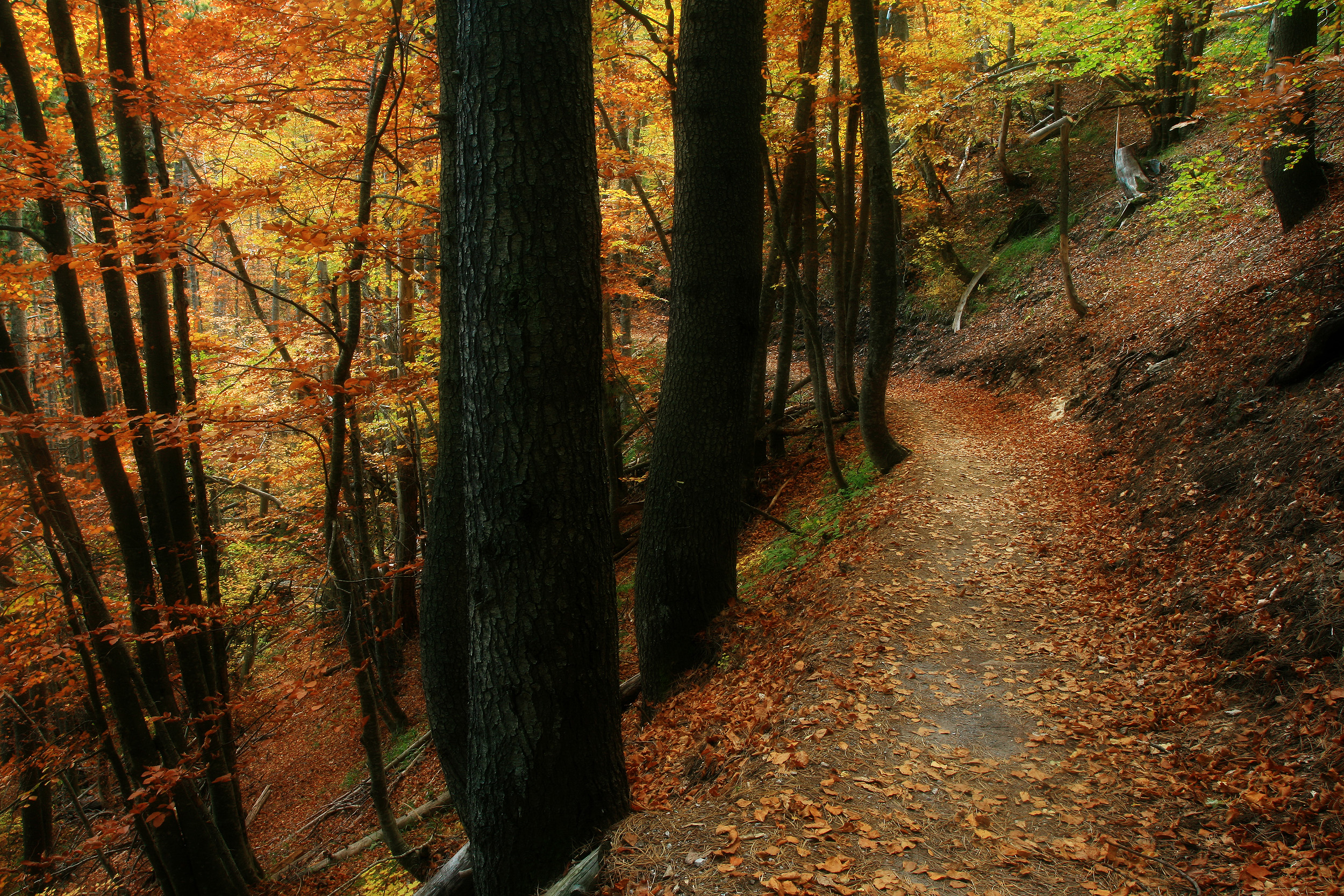
Beech forest along the path from Prionia to Spilios Agapitos refuge

The research of Olympus's plants started in 1836, when the French botanist Aucher-Éloy studied them. According to this and later studies, the National Park of Olympus is considered one of the richest flora regions in Greece, with about 1,700 species and subspecies, that represent some 25% of Greek flora. Of them 187 are characterized as significant, 56 are Greek endemic and of them 23 are local endemic, i.e. they can be found only in Olympus, and 16 are rare in Greece or have there the limits of their spread within Northern Greece.

An important book about the plants and flowers, from the beach of the Aegean Sea up to the upper regions of Mount Olympus, was written in 1980 by the Swedish botanist Arne Strid.

Most of those found in lower elevation are the common Mediterranean and central European species. Ramonda heldreichii (syn. Jankaea heldreichii), a plant relict of the Ice age, is of particular interest to botanists. The intense diversity of the landscape, the varying orientation of the slopes and their position in relation to the sea affect locally Olympus's climate and so a local microclimate prevails, combined with the geological background and the soil favor the growth of particular vegetation types and biotopes. Generally Olympus's northeast side is densely forested, as it receives the most rainfall, while the southwest one has significantly sparser vegetation.

=== Flora zones ===
In Olympus there are generally four sequential flora zones, but due to the complex topography and variety of microclimates, these do not form an obvious clear sequence with elevation.

==== Mediterranean vegetation zone ====
A zone of evergreen broadleaf trees (maquis) occurs between 300 and 500 metres elevation. Along with oak (Quercus ilex) and Greek strawberry tree (Arbutus andrachne) there occur kermes oak (Quercus coccifera), strawberry tree (Arbutus unedo), mock privet (Phillyrea latifolia), bay laurel (Laurus nobilis), cedar and others. Of the deciduous species most common are ash (Fraxinus), elm (Ulmus), Montpellier maple (Acer monspessulanum), Judas tree (Cercis siliquastrum), terebinth (Pistacia terebinthus), smoketree (Cotinus coggygria) and others.

==== Forest zone of beech, fir and mountain coniferous ====
Forest with beech, boxwood, holly, and ivy on the slopes of Mt Olympus

The evergreen broadleaf trees' zone is gradually replaced by ecosystems of European black pine (Pinus nigra), that forms compact clusters, with no intermediate zone of deciduous oaks, although trees of these species occur sporadically within clusters of black pine. On the northern slopes of Xirolakos valley, between 600 and 700 metres elevation, there is a high forest of downy oak (Quercus pubescens) of about 120 hectares.

The black pine dominates on the eastern and northern side of the mountain, between 500 and 1,700 metres. In this zone there is also hybrid fir (Abies × borisii-regis) in small groups and scrubs or small clumps, particularly in the lower region and in the sites Naoumi (west) and Stalamatia and Polykastro (east), where it is mixed with black pine and Bosnian pine (Pinus heldreichii). In this zone there is also beech (Fagus). While in the neighboring mountains Pierians and Ossa it creates an extended vegetation zone, in Olympus it is restricted to small clusters, appearing as islets, mainly in more humid locations and the best soils. A particularly rich variety of trees and shrubs is found in Enipeas's gorge. One can see there elm, cherry plum (Prunus cerasifera), European yew (Taxus baccata), hazel (Corylus avellana), holly (Ilex aquifolium), cornel cherry (Cornus mas), manna ash (Fraxinus ornus), maple (Acer spp.) and a considerable variety of herbaceous plants. Gorges and ravines are covered by oriental planes (Platanus orientalis), willows (Salix spp.), black alders (Alnus glutinosa) and riverside greenery.

==== Boreal coniferous zone ====
Typical species of this zone is Bosnian pine. This rare kind of pine occurs sporadically higher than 1,000 metres and gradually replaces the black pine, while over 1,400 metres it creates an almost unmixed forest. Over 2,000 metres the forest becomes sparser, reaching to 2,750 metres, thus creating one of the highest forest tree line limit (limit of forest growth) in the Balkans and Europe. Another feature of this zone is that over 2,500 metres the trees appear in a crawling form. The region, where Bosnian pine grows, is mostly dry and its slopes are rocky. There are no springs or water streams. The vegetation growing there is adapted to specific local conditions and represented by typical shrubs, graminaceous, chasmophytes etc., while the flora includes many endemic species of the Balkans.

==== Treeless high mountain zone (Alpine tundra) ====
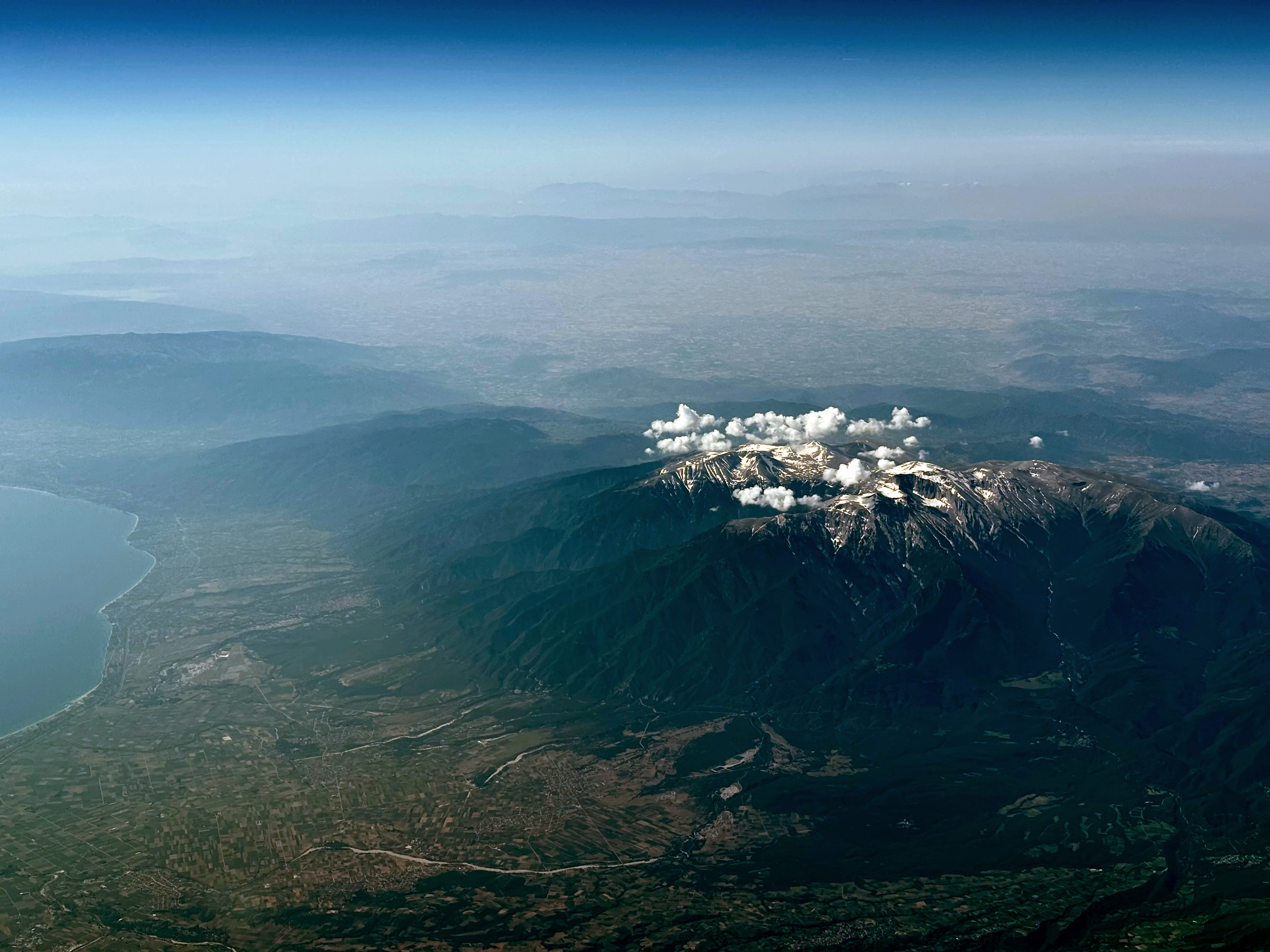
Aerial view with the treeless high mountain zone visible

Beyond Bosnian pine's zone follows an extensive zone, without trees, with alpine meadows, consisted by a mosaic of grassland ecosystems, depending on the topography, the slope and the orientation of the ground. In general, this alpine flora with more than 150 plant species, contains snow accumulation meadows, grassy swamps, alpine scree and rock crevices. On the meadows, the rocks and the steep slopes live most of the endemic plants. Half of them are found only in the Balkans and 23 only in Olympus.

=== Local endemic plants ===
The list of 23 local endemic plants at Mount Olympus from the Olympus National Park Management Agency:

Achillea ambrosiaca, Alyssum handelii, Asprerula muscosa, Aubrieta thessala, Campanula oreadum, Carum adamovicii, Centaurea incompleta, Centaurea litochorea, Centaurea transiens, Cerastrium theophrasti, Coincla nivalis, Erysimum olympicum, Festuca olympica, Genista sakellariadis, Ramonda heldreichii, Ligusticum olympicum, Melampyrus ciliatum, Ophrys helenae (Ophrys sphegodes subsp. helenae), Poa thessala, Potentilla deorum, Rynchosinapis nivalis, Silene dionysii, Silene oligantha, Veronica thessalica, Viola striis-notata, Viola pseudograeca.

== Fauna ==
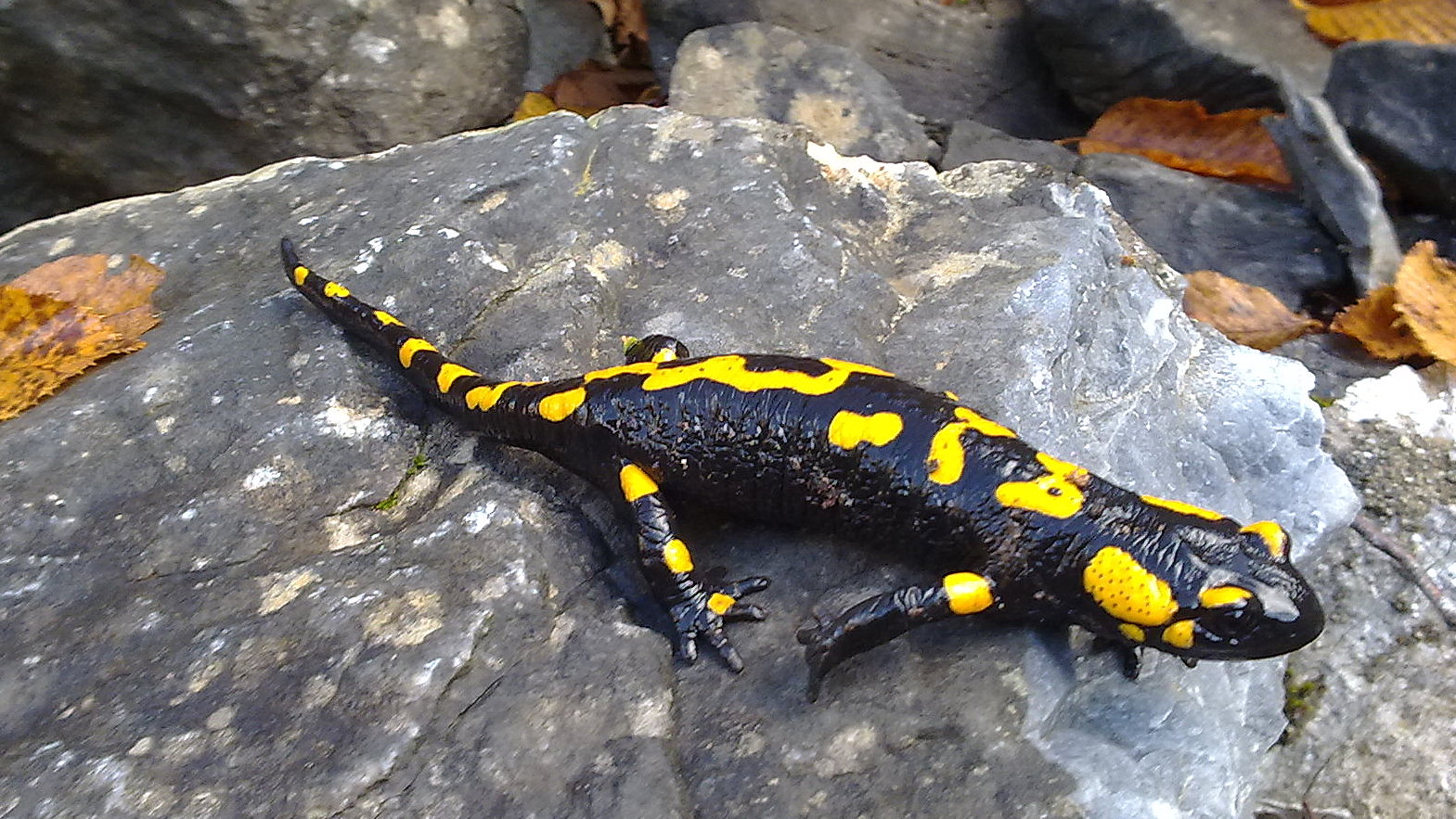
Fire salamander in Enipeas's gorge

Olympus's fauna, which has not been systematically studied so far, includes considerable variety and is marked by important, rare and endangered species. Large mammals, that lived formerly in the region, like roe deer, have disappeared. In ancient times there were lions (Pausanias), while at least until the 16th century there were brown bears (Life of St. Dionysios the Later).

Thirty-two mammal species have been recorded, including Balkan chamois (Rupicapra rupicapra balcanica), roe deer (Capreolus capreolus), wild boar, wildcat (Felis sylvestris), beech marten (Martes foina), red fox and red squirrel. There have also been detected 108 species of birds (like sparrowhawk, cinereous vulture, rock partridge, white stork, rock dove, European robin, lanner falcon, peregrine falcon, tree falcon, golden eagle, short-toed snake eagle, booted eagle and hoopoe). Many of them, particularly the birds of prey, are scarce. In addition there are the common reptiles of Greek fauna (22 species such as snakes, turtles, lizards, etc.) and some amphibians (8 species) in streams and seasonal ponds, as well as a great variety of insects, particularly butterflies.

== National Park ==
Greece's highest mountain, dwelling of the Twelve Gods of antiquity, has been the first region in the country to be applied specific protective rules, by its declaration as a National Park in 1938. The aim of this declaration was "...the preservation in perpetuity of the natural environment of the region, i.e. of wild flora, fauna and natural landscape, as well as its cultural and other values...". In addition the declaration has aimed promoting scientific research along with environmental education for the public and tourist development in the region. Specific laws prohibit all forms of exploitation on the eastern side of the mountain in an area of about 4,000 hectares, that is the core of the Park. A wider region, around this core, has been designated "peripheral zone of the National Park", so that its managing and exploitation to be done so as not to adversely affect the core's protection. At present, the park has been expanded to 24,000 hectares. Administratively it belongs to Pieria's and Larissa's Prefectures and specifically to the municipalities Diou-Olympou and Katerinis (Pieria) and Τempon and Elassonas (Larissa). Its lowest elevation is 600 metres and its peak, Mytikas, at 2,917.727 metres. In 1981, UNESCO proclaimed Olympus "Biosphere Reserve". The European Union has listed Olympus in the "Significant for Birdlife Regions of European Union". It is also registered in the list of Natura 2000 European Network as a special protection area and a site of community interest.

In June 2016 the Olympus National Park Information Center, located at Litochoro, opened its gates. It informs their visitors about geology, archaeological sites, mythology, monasteries, plants, animals and other subjects affecting Mount Olympus. Hikers will find help from professional rangers, a guide provides tours for groups in the mountain area.

=== Olympus National Park regulations ===
The Park is protected by specific legislation. Under the "Special Regulation" entrance to the Park is allowed only by the existing roads and traffic is allowed from sunrise to sunset only on formed paths. The visitor should also know that the following activities are not allowed: (Note: Olympus National Park is protected by special legislation. The following legislative decrees apply to offenders of the law: Legislative Decree 86/1969, Legislative Decree 996/1971, and Laws 177/1975, 998/1979, 1650/1986, 2742/1999 and 3044/2002.)

- Entrance to children under 14 years unescorted.
- Parking in places other than the specific parking lots.
- Felling, humus transportation, rooting and collecting shrubs, plants and seeds.
- Hunting any animal by any means throughout the year.
- Collection and destruction of nests, eggs or chicks and general disturbance and destruction of fauna species.
- Damage to geological formations.
- Free movement of any animals accompanying visitors.

== Access ==
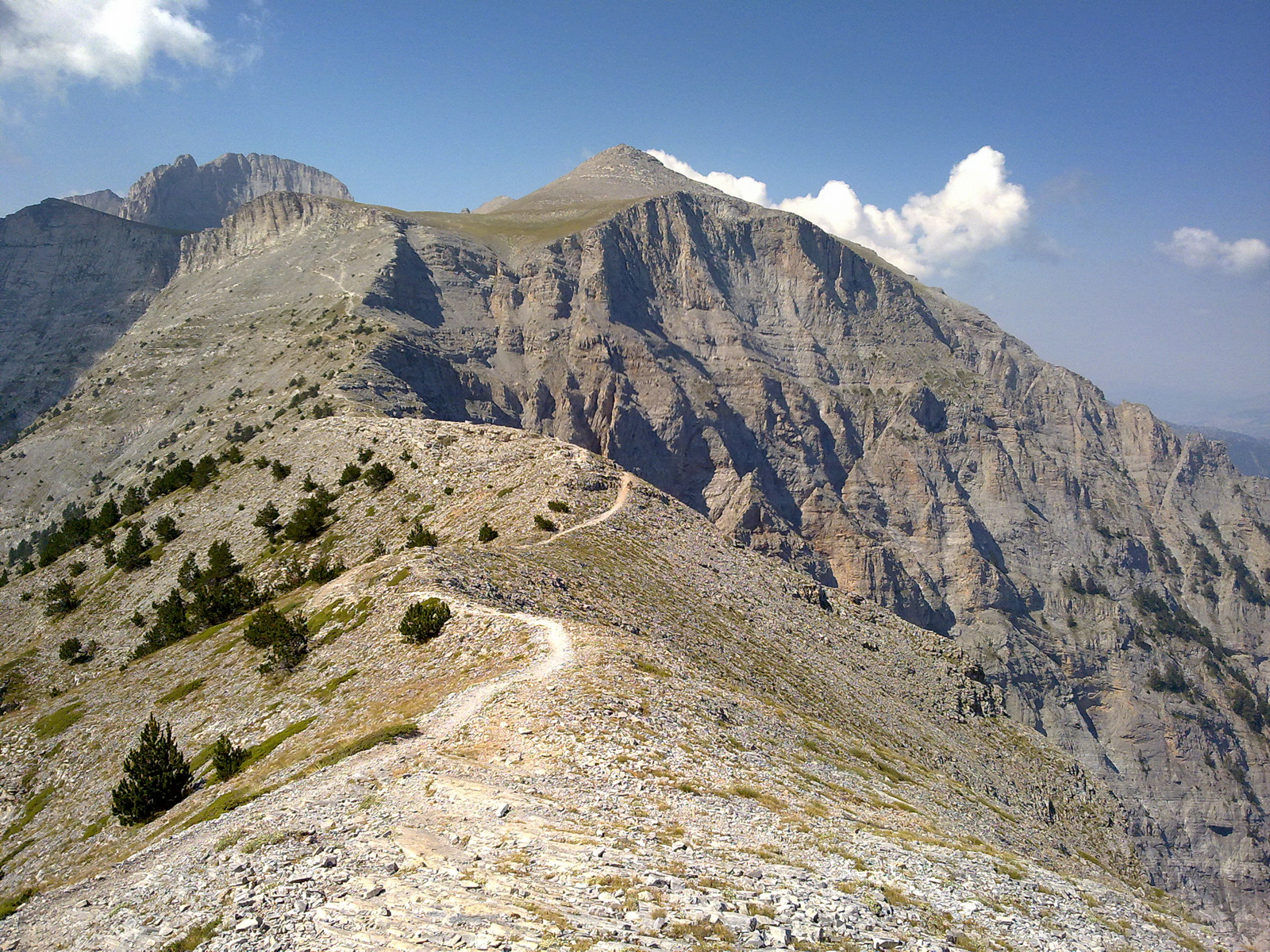
The path in the Laimou-Ghiosou passage (location Skourta) with the high Olympus peaks in the background

Olympus's massif is found about in the middle of Continental Greece and is easy to approach from the national railway network on the Athens-Thessaloniki line and the secondary roads that connect towns and villages around the mountain, with the principal base for excursions being the town of Litochoro, where there are many hotels and taverns. In addition, on Pieria's coastal zone there are many camp sites and lodgings. The nearest international airport is that of Thessaloniki, and railway stations are those of Litochoro, Katerini and Leptokarya. There is frequent service by KTEL buses and a taxi stand is in Litochoro's central square.

== Refuges ==
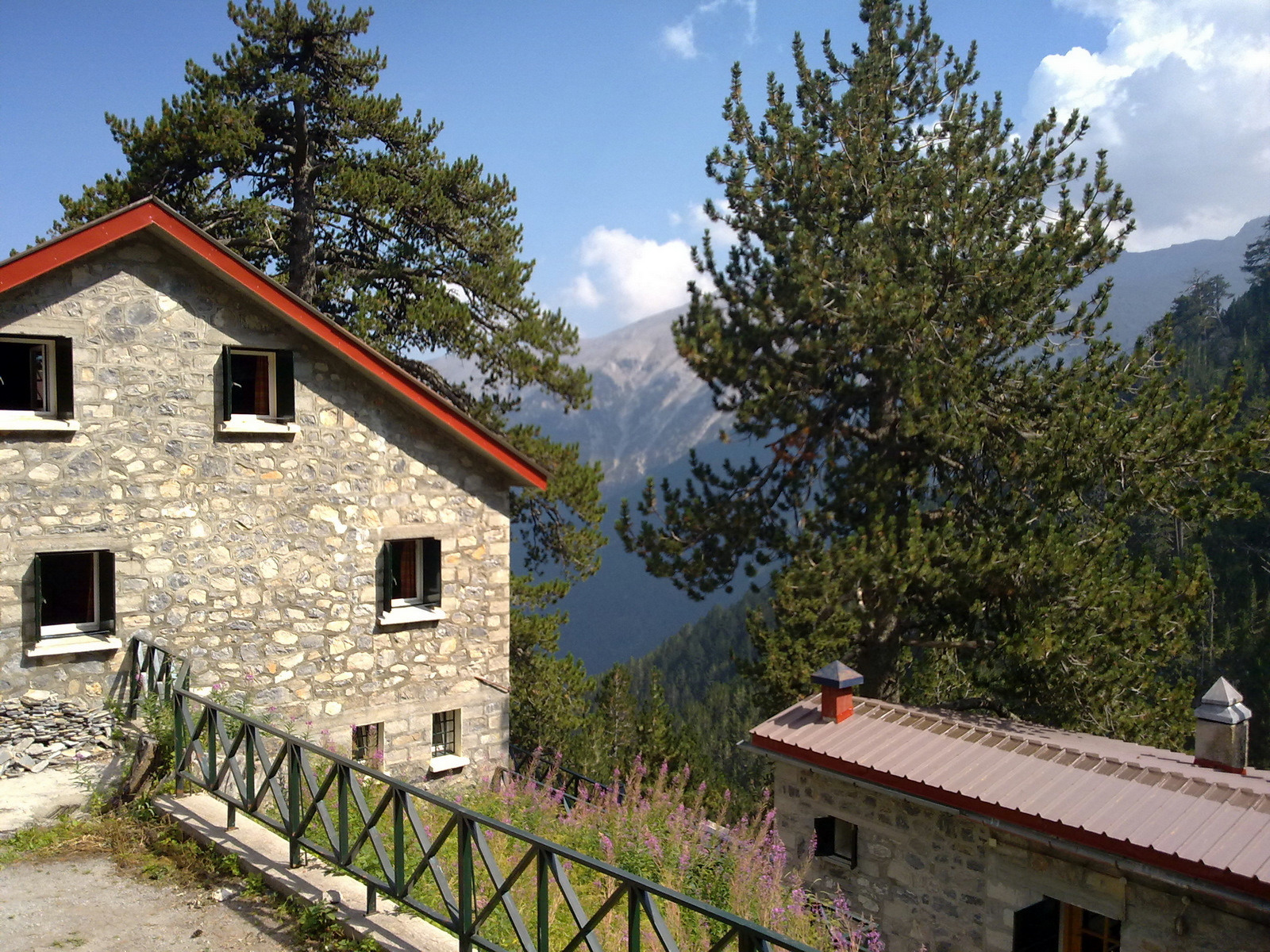
The "Spilios Agapitos" refuge

- Spilios Agapitos, the first refuge of the region, is at the site "Βalkoni" (or "Exostis") at 2,100 metres (6,900 ft) elevation. It is in the center of Mavrologos and belongs to Greek Federation of Mountaineering Club (E.O.O.S).
- Vrysopoules, the second refuge, is westerly behind Mavratzas's gorge at the site Vrysopoules (1,800 m) and is accessible also by car from Sparmos. It has been managed by the Κ.Ε.Ο.Α.Χ (Army Skiers) since 1961. It provides 30 beds, a kitchen, water, electricity, central heating and a fireplace. It is open all year round, but to overnight a military license is required.
- Christos Kakalos is at the southwest edge of Muses' Plateau (2,648 m). It belongs to Greek Federation of Mountaineering and Climbing (Ε.Ο.Ο.Α) that operates it from May to October and provides 18 beds, electricity, blankets, a kitchen and tank water. It is managed by one of the best experienced Greek climbers, the geologist Mihalis Stylas.
- Stavros ("Dimitrios Bountolas") is on the eastern side of Olympus, 9.5 km on asphalt road away from Litochoro, at 930 metres (3,050 ft) elevation, in the Dionysios Monastery forest. It belongs to the Greek Mountaineering Club of Thessaloniki, operates all year round, mainly as refreshment room and restaurant and can host 30 persons. It is managed by the Doultsinou family.
- Giosos Apostolidis is on Muses' Plateau (Diaselo – 2,760 m) and belongs to the Club of Greek mountaineers of Thessaloniki. It can accommodate 80 persons, it provides electricity, water, a fireplace and an equipped kitchen and it is open from June to October. It is managed by Dimitris Zorbas.
- Petrostrouga is on the second, more common, path to Olympus (D10), the same path to reach to Muses' Plateau. This refuge is at 1,900 metres (6,200 ft) elevation, surrounded by perennial Bosnian pines. It can accommodate 60 persons, it provides an equipped kitchen, electricity, water and a fireplace and it is open all year round. It is managed by the Hellenic Rescue Team. It provides organized medical equipment and one of the three emergency heliports in Olympus (the others at Skourta and Spilios Agapitos) and emergency wireless inside and out of the refuge.

=== Emergency refuges ===
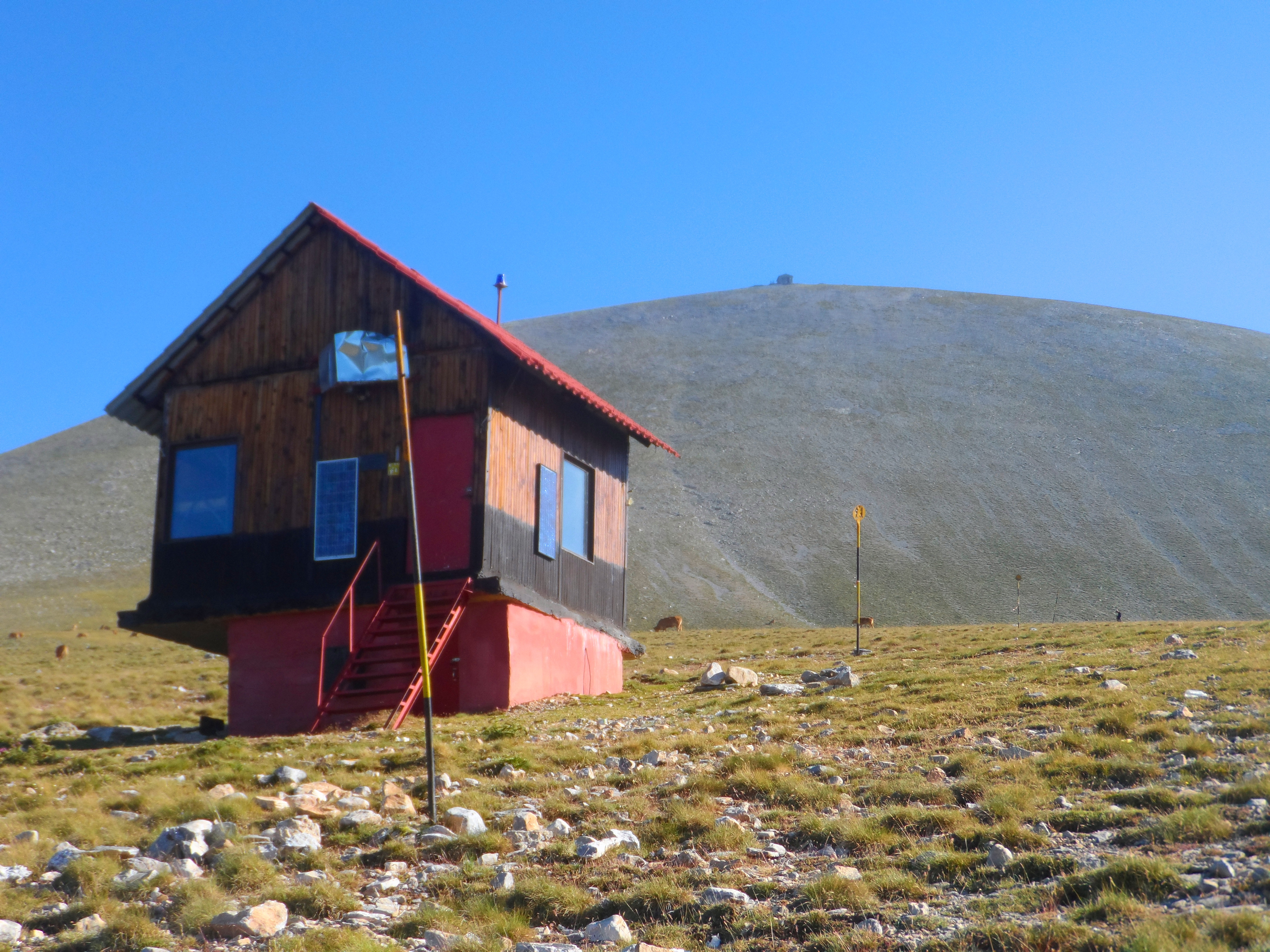
Emergency refuge of Kostas Migotzidis and at the top behind the refuge of Aghios Antonios

- Aghios Antonios emergency refuge on the summit Aghios Antonios (2,817 m) is equipped with emergency items by the Hellenic Rescue Team. In the refuge there is wireless communication in case of emergency.
- Kalyva tou Christaki emergency refuge is in "Megali Gourna" (2,430 m) along the Path E4, Kokinopilos – Skala. The refuge does not provide emergency items (there are only beds) and is only for protection from bad weather.
- Kakalos emergency refuge at the "oropedio ton mouson" belongs to the Greek Mountaineering & Climbing Federation and is located at the eastern margin of the Plateau of Muses at an elevation of 2,650 metres (8,690 ft). It was named after Christos Kakalos the Olympus hunter and guide who together with the Swiss climbers Fred Boissonnas and Daniel Baud Bovy made the first recorded ascent to Olympus highest peak Mytikas on 2 August 1913. It has a capacity of 25 people and offers lodging, food and toilets. It is open from mid May to end of October and from December to mid April.

The official list of the refuges at Mount Olympus is maintained by the Olympus National Park Management Agency.

== Coin ==
Mount Olympus and the national Park around it were selected as the main motif for the Greek National Park Olympus commemorative coin, minted in 2005. On the reverse, the War of the Titans on Mount Olympus is portrayed along with flowering branches on the lower part of the coin. Above the scene is written, in Greek, "National Park Olympus".

== See also ==
- List of mountains in Greece
- Sacred mountains
- Mount Olympus Water & Theme Park
- Olympus Geological History Museum
- Olympus Mountain running competitions
- Live From Mount Olympus
