= Skopia, Elassona =

Skopia Σκοπιά
- Settlement
- Location within Greece
- Coordinates: 39°59.6′N 22°14′E
- Country: Greece
- Administrative region: Thessaly
- Regional unit: Larissa
- Municipality: Elassona
- Municipal unit: Olympos
- Community: Flampouro
- Elevation: 540 m (1,770 ft)

Population (2021)
  - Total: 79
- Time zone: UTC+2 (EET)
  - Summer (DST): UTC+3 (EEST)
- Postal code: 402 00
- Area code: +30-2493
- Vehicle registration: PI

Skopia (Greek: Σκοπιά, Greek pronunciation: [skop'ça]) is a village of the Elassona municipality. Before the 2011 local government reform it was a part of the municipality of Olympos. The 2021 census recorded 79 inhabitants in the village. Skopia is a part of the community of Flampouro.

== See also ==
- List of settlements in the Larissa regional unit
