= Olympus National Park =

National park in Greece

- IUCN category II (national park)
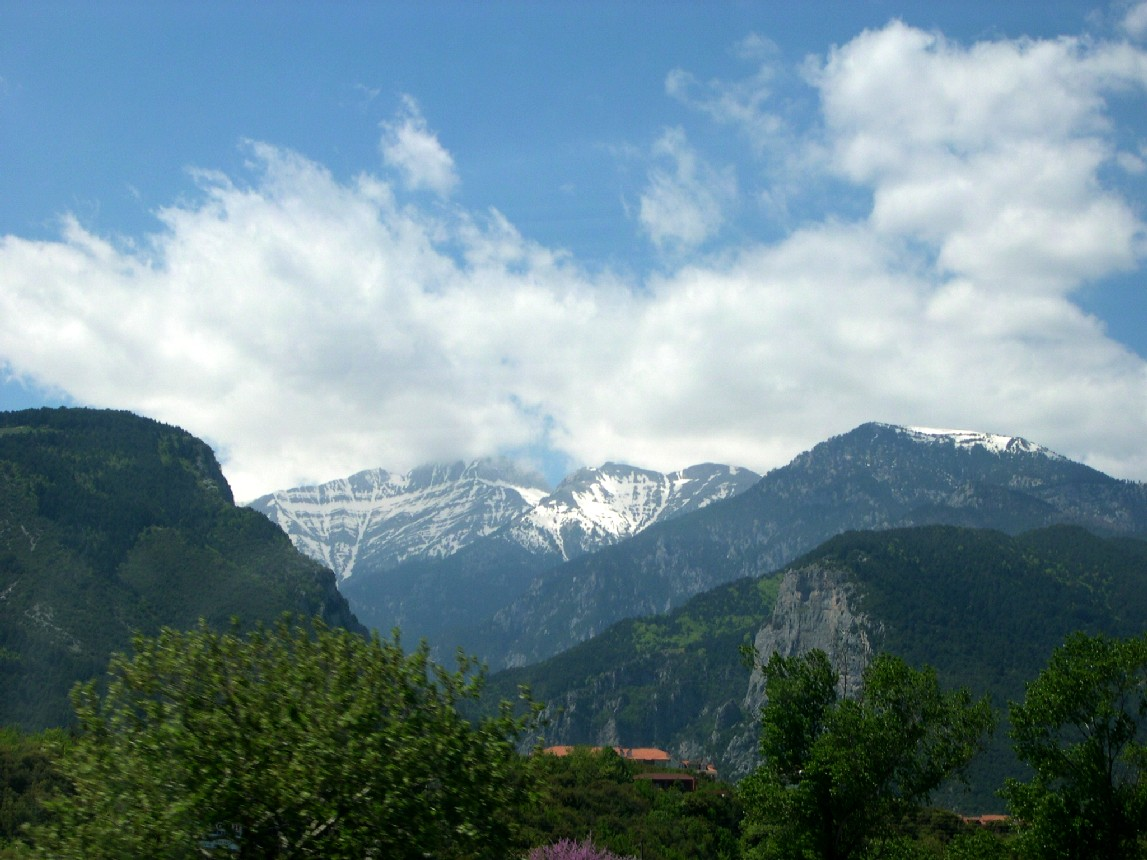

- Location within Greece
- Location: Thessaly and Central Macedonia, Greece
- Coordinates: 40°05′08″N 22°21′31″E
- Area: 39.88 km^{2} (15.40 sq mi)
- Established: 1938
- Visitors: ~180,000 (in 1999)
- Governing body: Pieria Forestry Service and the Management Agency of Olympus National Park.

UNESCO World Heritage Site
- Official name: Wider Area of Mount Olympus
- Criteria: Mixed: vi, x
- Reference: 1719
- Inscription: 2026 (48th Session)

Olympus National Park (Greek: Εθνικός δρυμός Ολύμπου) is a national park in northern Greece, in the Greek regions of Thessaly and Central Macedonia. The national park was established on 9 June 1938, making it the oldest national park in the country. It has an area of 39.88 km². The park lies on and around Mount Olympus — the highest mountain in Greece and the mythological dwelling place of the gods. On 15 December 1981, the area was added to the list of biosphere reserves under UNESCO's Man and the Biosphere Programme (MAB). In July 2026, the wider area of Mount Olympus was inscribed on the UNESCO World Heritage List as a mixed World Heritage Site, in recognition of its natural and cultural significance.

== Mythology ==
Olympus National Park is named after Mount Olympus. In Greek mythology, the mountain is known as the place where the twelve Olympian gods lived. The Ancient Greeks believed that the gods had their palaces in the mountain gorges and that the highest peak, Mytikas (2,918 metres), was their meeting place. They also believed that the throne of Zeus, the chief god, was located here, and that this was the place where the gods held their stormy debates.

== Characteristics ==
Mount Olympus is the highest mountain in Greece and the second-highest in the Balkan Peninsula. On the eastern slopes, the mountain consists of dolomitic limestones from the Upper Triassic (200–2,000 metres); the western and southern slopes date from the Paleocene or Cretaceous (1,200–2,000 metres); and the Mytikas complex is dated to the Jurassic (2,000–2,918 metres). On the western slopes, between 700 and 1,100 metres, gneiss also occurs, and on the northwestern slopes, between 600 and 1,200 metres, flysch dating from the Eocene is found. The dominant presence of limestone has a strong influence on the climate and vegetation. Limestone makes the local climate drier, as the temperature rises more quickly and the rock absorbs precipitation.

There are four main vegetation zones in the national park, distributed according to altitude. Between 300 and 500 metres, evergreen vegetation is found, with shrubland and low trees such as holm oak (Quercus ilex), Greek strawberry tree (Arbutus andrachne) and kermes oak (Quercus coccifera). Elevations between 600 and 1,400 metres host beech–silver fir communities. These consist mainly of beech (Fagus sylvatica), interspersed in places with species such as Bulgarian fir (Abies borisii-regis), oriental hornbeam (Carpinus orientalis) and black pine (Pinus nigra pallasiana), although pure black pine forests also occur at these altitudes. Stands of Bosnian pine (Pinus heldreichii) are found between 1,400 and 2,500 metres. At an elevation of about 2,500 metres, Mount Olympus holds the highest tree line in Europe. Above this tree line, biotopes such as alpine grasslands, deep gorges and rocky peaks are present.

== Fauna ==
The area is home to 32 mammal species and is an important refuge for the Balkan chamois (Rupicapra rupicapra balcanica) in Greece. In 2009, the number of individuals was estimated at 50 to 70. In addition, mammals such as the greater horseshoe bat (Rhinolophus ferrumequinum), Geoffroy's bat (Myotis emarginatus), wolf (Canis lupus), golden jackal (Canis aureus), wildcat (Felis silvestris), wild boar (Sus scrofa), beech marten (Martes foina) and edible dormouse (Glis glis) also live there.

By 2008, 108 bird species had been recorded in the national park. Among the many birds in the area are rarities such as the golden eagle (Aquila chrysaetos), wallcreeper (Tichodroma muraria) and three-toed woodpecker (Picoides tridactylus), and during the breeding season species such as the Egyptian vulture (Neophron percnopterus), Alpine swift (Tachymarptis melba), greater short-toed lark (Calandrella brachydactyla), ortolan bunting (Emberiza hortulana), and Cretzschmar's bunting (Emberiza caesia) are also encountered.

== Gallery ==
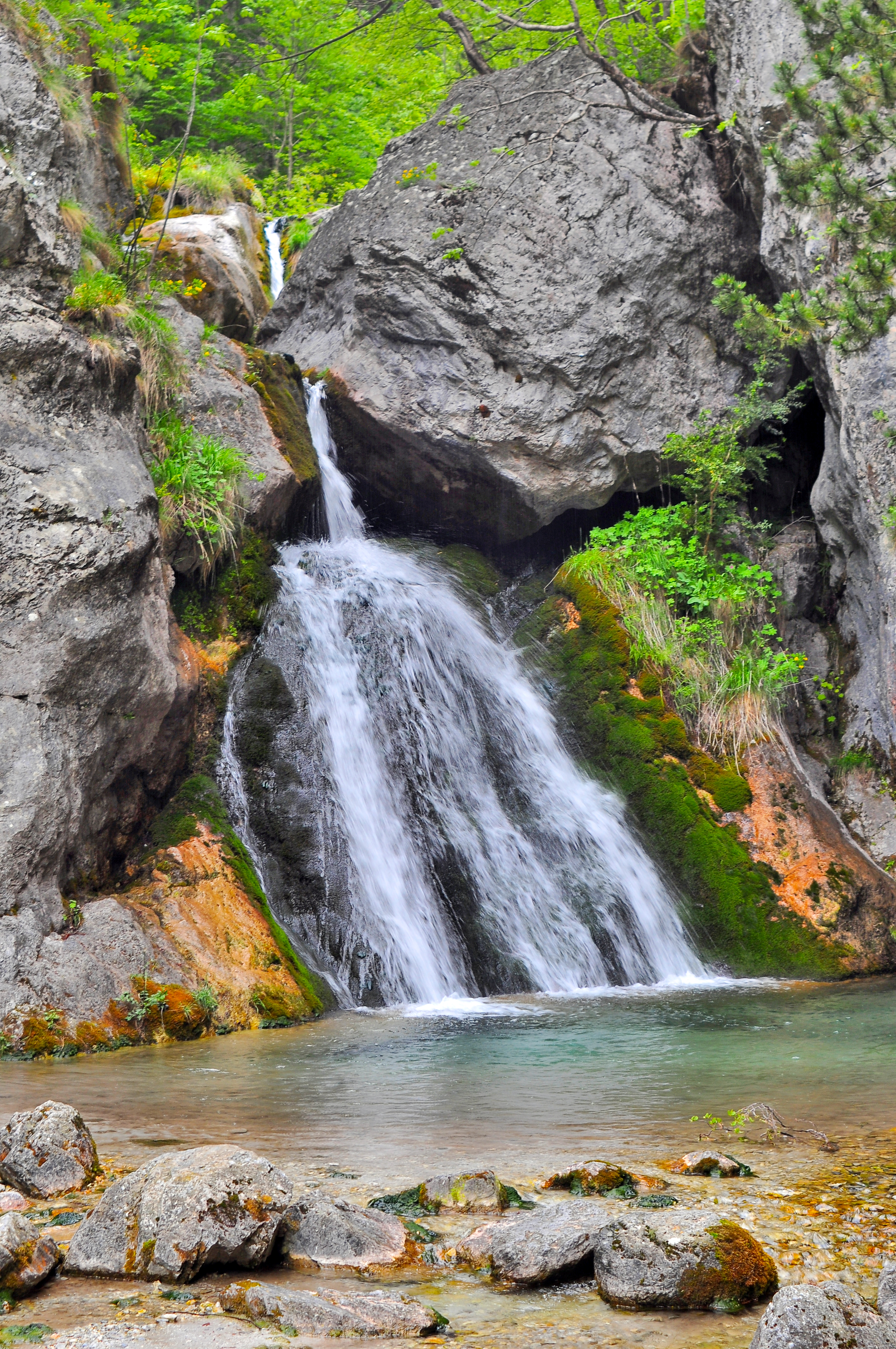
Waterfall on one of the lower slopes.

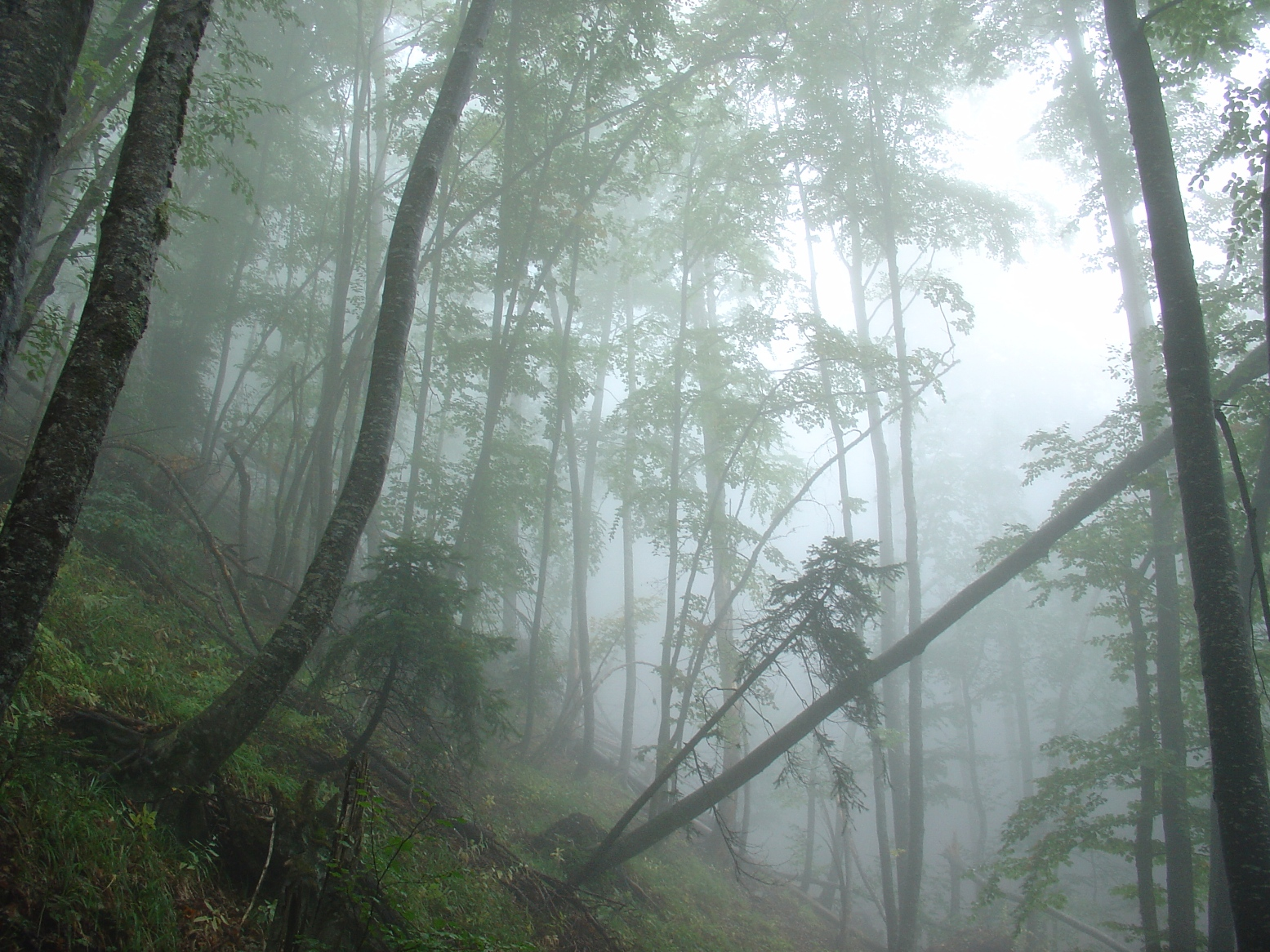
Beech forest on the lower slopes of Mount Olympus.

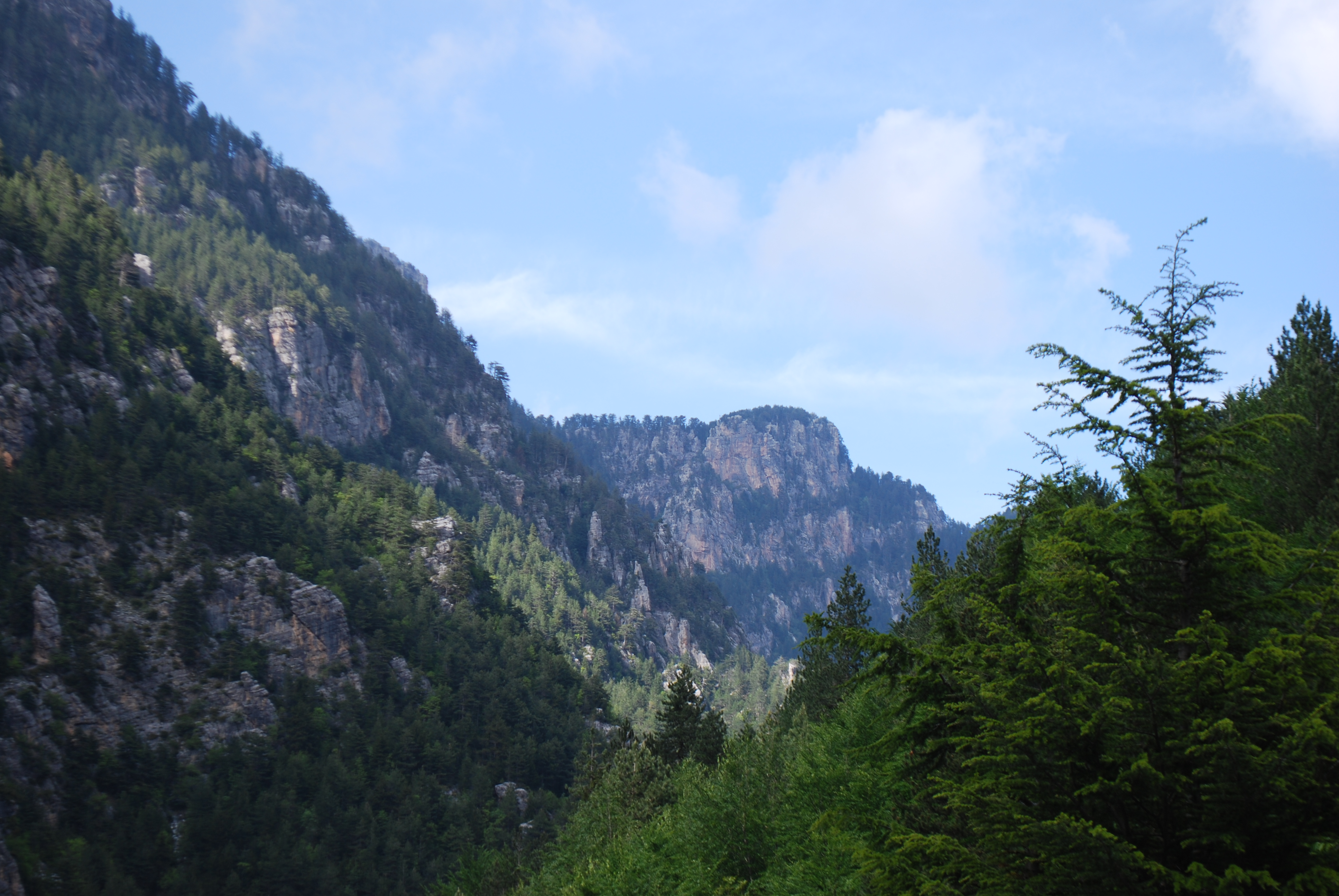
Gorges and mountain forests of Mount Olympus.

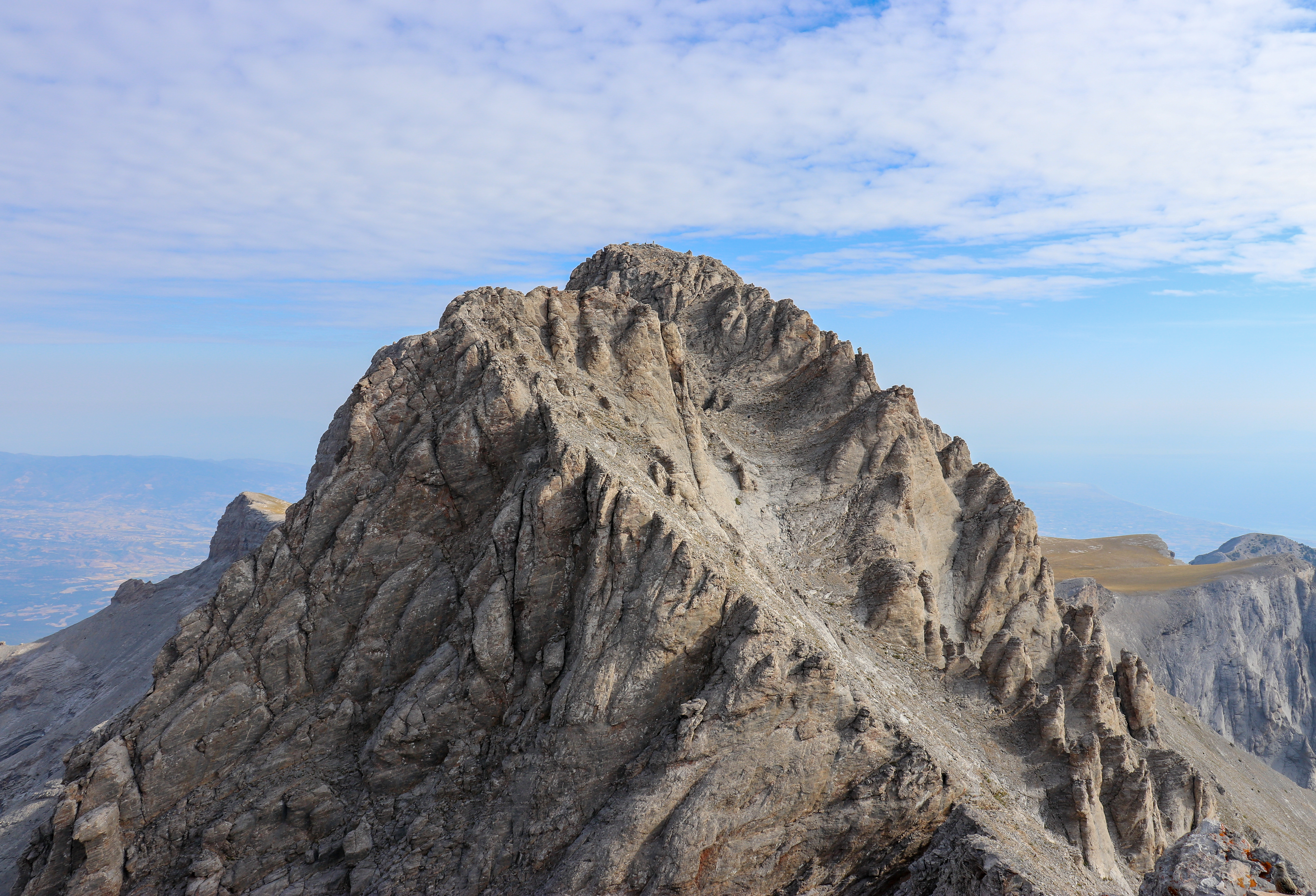
Peak of Mytikas (2,918 m).

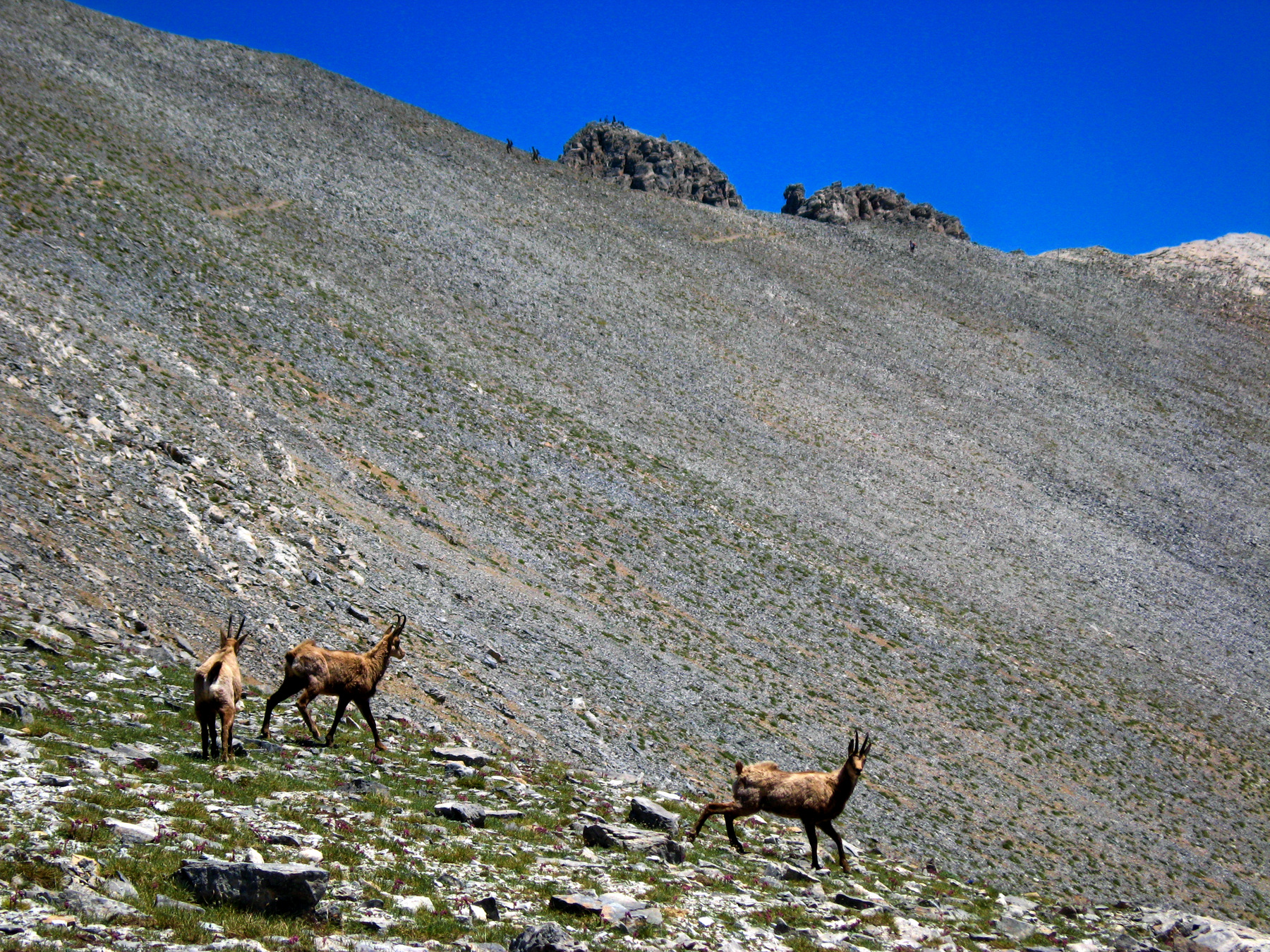
Balkan chamois on the upper slopes of Mount Olympus.

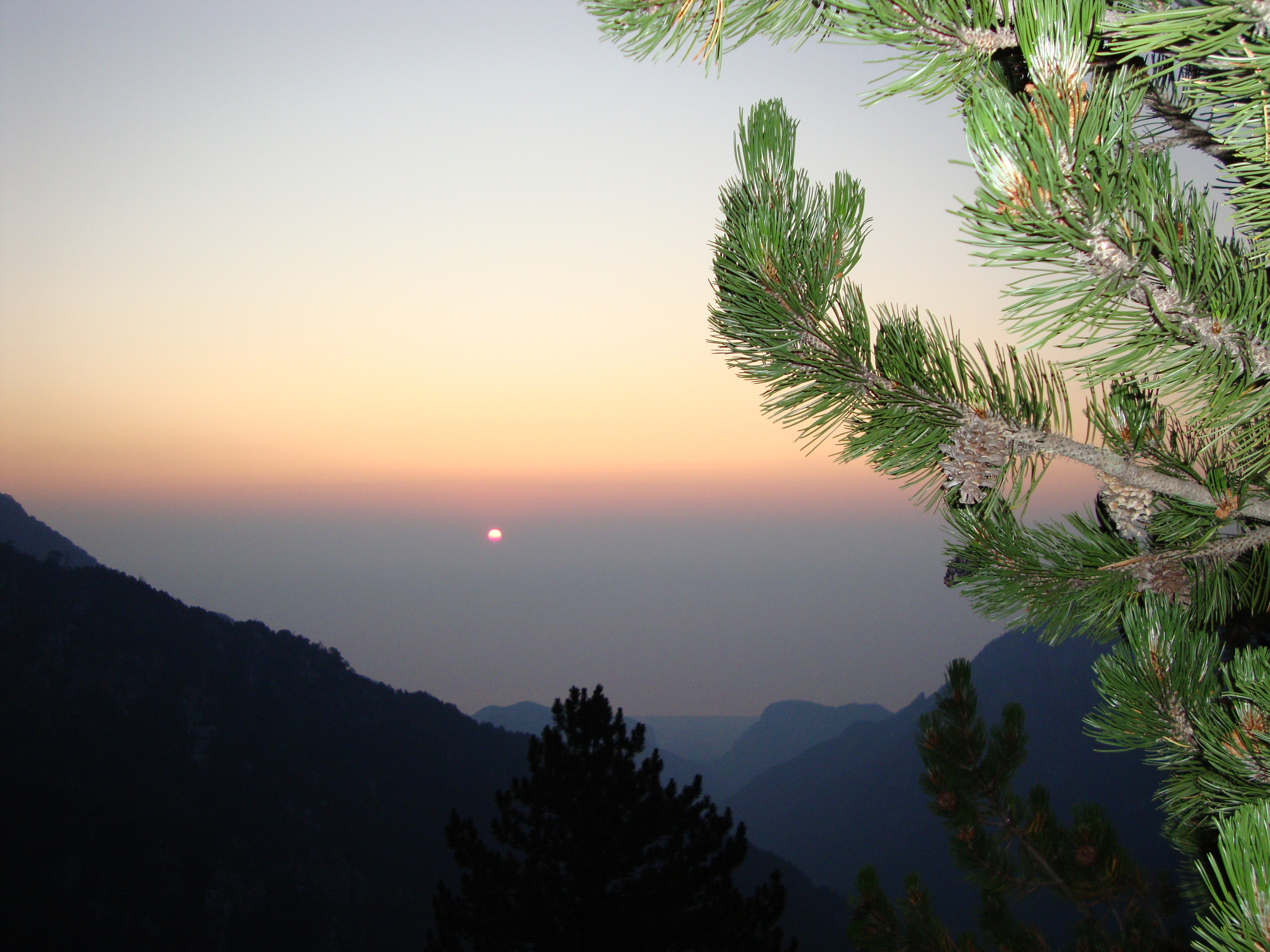
Sunset.

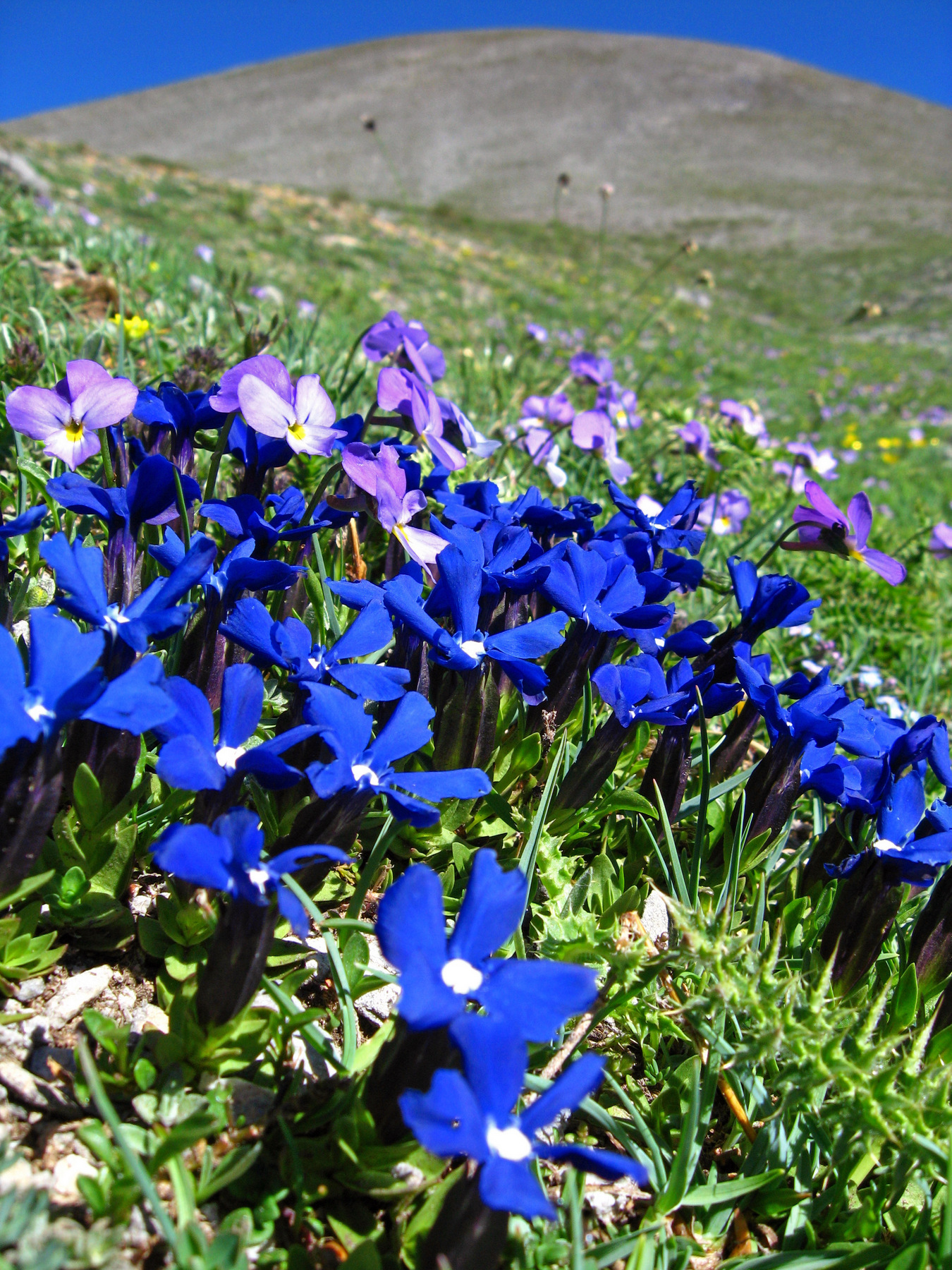
Spring gentians (Gentiana verna) on the alpine grasslands.
