= Kalyvia, Larissa =

Kalyvia Καλύβια
- Settlement
- Location within Greece
- Coordinates: 40°1.4′N 22°14.5′E
- Country: Greece
- Administrative region: Thessaly
- Regional unit: Larissa
- Municipality: Elassona
- Municipal unit: Olympos
- Community: Kokkinopilos
- Elevation: 600 m (2,000 ft)

Population (2021)
  - Total: 420
- Time zone: UTC+2 (EET)
  - Summer (DST): UTC+3 (EEST)
- Postal code: 402 00
- Area code: +30-2493
- Vehicle registration: PI

Kalyvia (Greek: Καλύβια, Greek pronunciation: [ka'lyvʝa]) is an Aromanian (Vlach) village of the Elassona municipality, Thessaly, Greece. Before the 2011 local government reform it was part of the municipality of Olympos. Kalyvia is a part of the community of Kokkinopilos.

== Population ==
Historical population
Year	Pop.	±%
2001	488	—
2011	467	−4.3%
2021	420	−10.1%

== History ==
Kalyvia was founded during the Ottoman rule of Greece by Vlachs from Kokkinopilos. After World War II and the burning of Kokkinopilos Kalyvia was made a permanent settlement in 1950's.

== See also ==
- List of settlements in the Larissa regional unit
