= Olympus Geological History Museum =

Geological museum in Leptokarya at Mount Olympus, Greece

Coordinates: 40.057465°N 22.559982°E

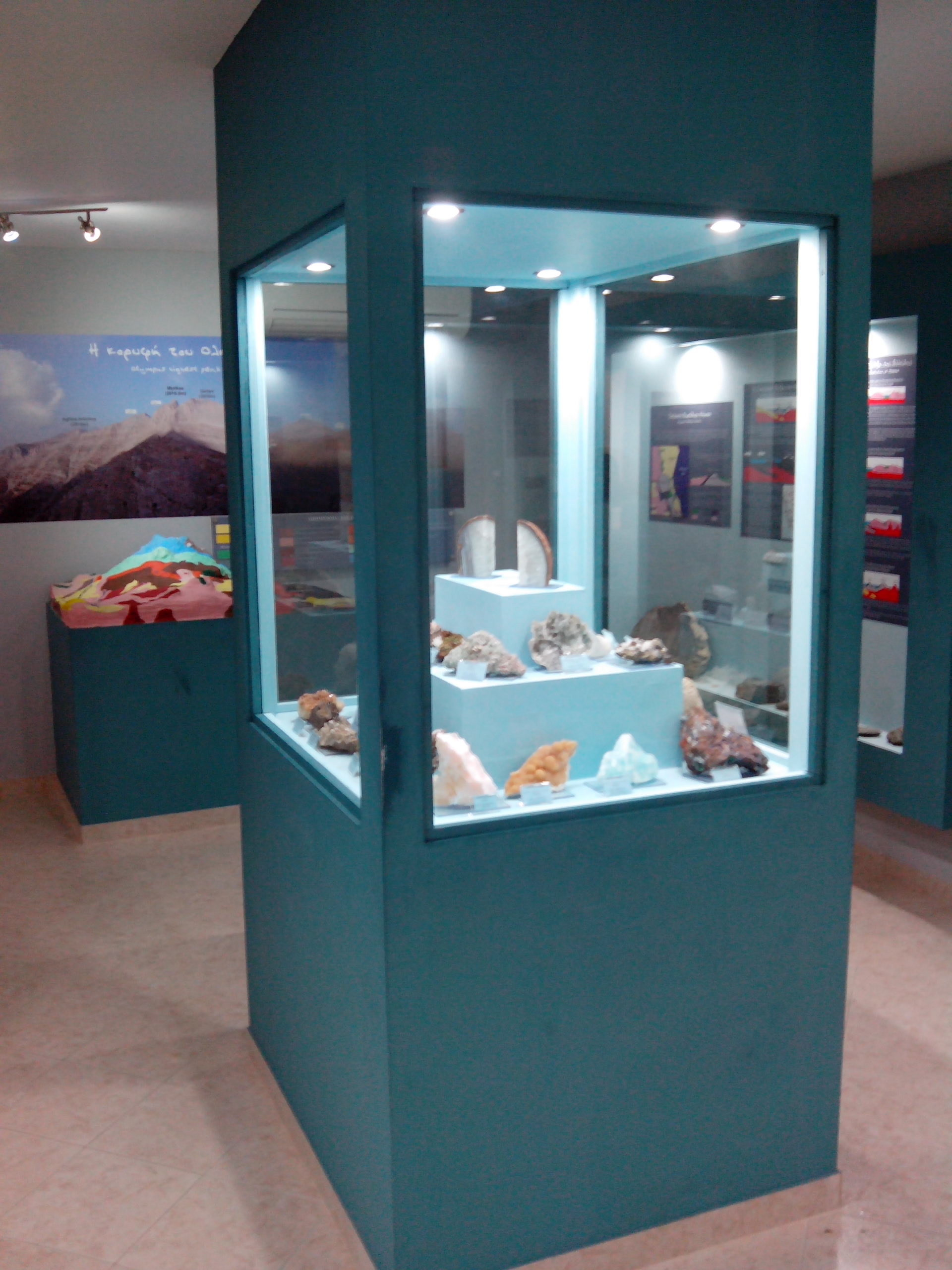
View inside the museum

The Olympus Geological History Museum (Greek: Μουσείο Γεωλογικής Ιστορίας Ολύμπου, Mouseio Geologikis Istorias Olympou) is a geological museum in the town of Leptokarya at the foot of Mount Olympus in northern Greece. It presents in several exhibition rooms, rocks and minerals from the region and fossils from the Olympus and from the surrounding area. It was established with the help of the Geology faculty of the Aristotle University of Thessaloniki.

== Structure of the museum ==
While finds from the whole of Greece are exhibited in the classrooms, a separate exhibition room is devoted exclusively to Mount Olympus. The history of the formation of the mountains is shown. Various types of fossilized plants and fossils are exhibited.

== The exhibits ==
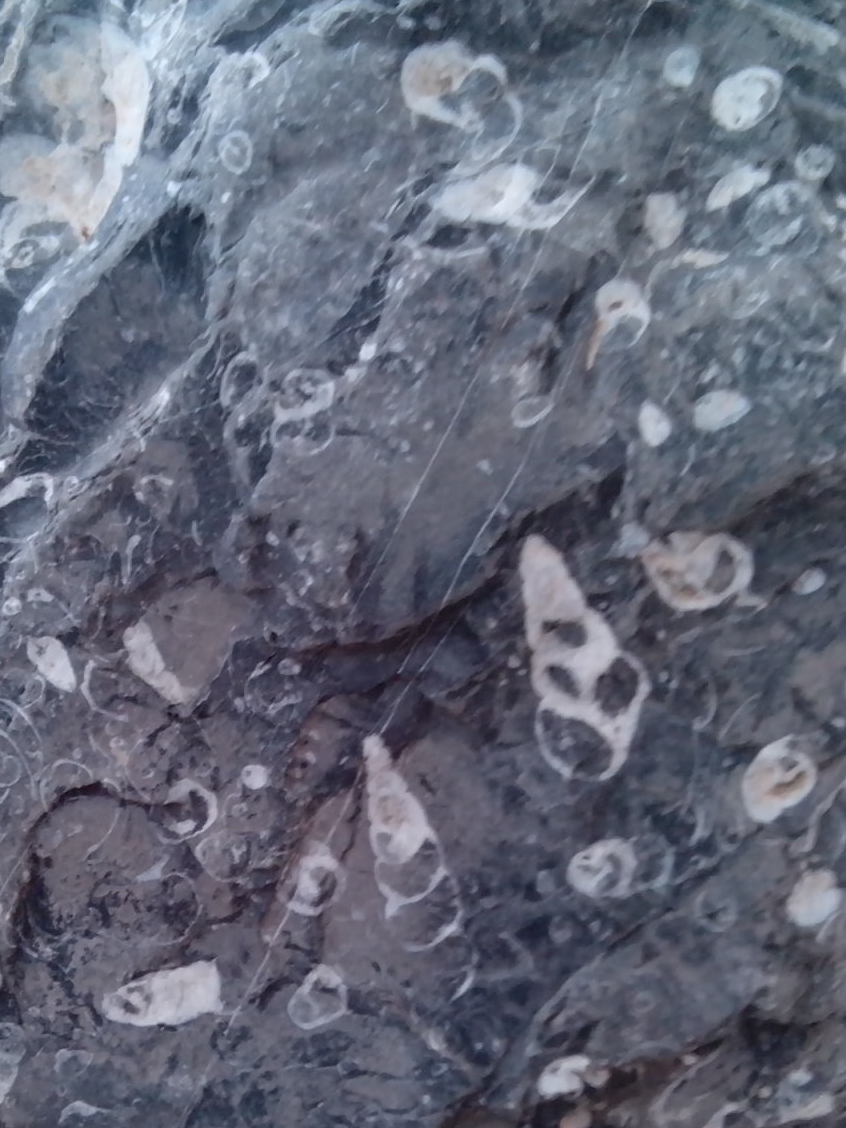
Fossilized mussels

The geological development of Greece will be explained with the help of folders. Using a model of the Olympus, the distribution of the various types of rock in the mountain range is shown. All known types of rocks occurring in the Olympus region are exhibited in showcases.

As a result of the displacement of the continental plates, Olympus is still pushed up by one to four millimeters per year. This is the reason why there are petrified marine animals at a height of around 1000 to 1500 meters. A hitherto unique find was an ammonite found at an altitude of about 1100 meters. Other witnesses who were part of the mountain formerly under the sea level are limestones that were drilled by mussels (Litophagae) or limestones include petrified sea-worms.

The Olymp is a so-called tectonic window. This means that erosion and warping have released old rock layers that would normally be hidden. This fact ensures that geologists from all over the world travel to Olympus for research purposes.

Further panels explain that Mount Olympus got its present form after the Würm ice age. As the ice receded, masses of gravel were moved along. This process shaped the landscape and influenced the shape of some stones. They are round at the top and flattened at the bottom.

A showcase is devoted to the theme of petrification. Exhibited are petrified plants and animals.

So far only a few smaller caves have been discovered. Some of them are filled with ice which does not melt even in summer.

There is the possibility of astronomical observations at night.

== Cooperation ==
Since 2013, this private museum has been cooperating with the Aristotle University of Thessaloniki. In two classrooms, school classes are taught about the geology of Mount Olympus.
