= Olympiada, Larissa =

Olympiada Ολυμπιάδα
- Community
- Location within Greece
- Coordinates: 39°59.2′N 22°15.2′E
- Country: Greece
- Administrative region: Thessaly
- Regional unit: Larissa
- Municipality: Elassona
- Municipal unit: Olympos

Area
  - Community: 12.904 km^{2} (4.982 sq mi)
- Elevation: 550 m (1,800 ft)

Population (2021)
  - Community: 444
  - Density: 34.4/km^{2} (89.1/sq mi)
- Time zone: UTC+2 (EET)
  - Summer (DST): UTC+3 (EEST)
- Postal code: 402 00
- Area code: +30-2493
- Vehicle registration: PI

Olympiada (Greek: Ολυμπιάδα, Greek pronunciation: [olibi'aða]) is a village and a community of the Elassona municipality. Before the 2011 local government reform it was a part of the municipality of Olympos. The community of Olympiada covers an area of 12.904 km^{2}.

== Administrative division ==
The community of Olympiada consists of two settlements:

- Olympiada
- Sparmos

== Population ==
Historical population
Year	Pop.	±%
2001	394	—
2011	591	+50.0%
2021	444	−24.9%

== History ==
Olympiada was founded by Pontic refugees, who came from the former Russian province Kars Oblast in Eastern Anatolia during the 1923 population exchange. Christoforos Tsertikidis is said to be the leading founder of Olympiada, and is honored with a statue in the village square.

== See also ==
- List of settlements in the Larissa regional unit
