= Pereia =

Coordinates: 39°10′57″N 22°24′15″E

Pereia (Ancient Greek: Πήρεια) was a town of Phthiotis in ancient Thessaly. In 302 BC, Cassander planned to transfer the town's population to Phthiotic Thebes but this was prevented by Demetrius Poliorcetes.

Its site is located at the modern Petroto (formerly Tsatma).
