= Lofos, Elassona =

Lofos Λόφος
- Community
- Location within Greece
- Coordinates: 40°1′N 22°11.1′E
- Country: Greece
- Administrative region: Thessaly
- Regional unit: Larissa
- Municipality: Elassona
- Municipal unit: Olympos

Area
  - Community: 23.674 km^{2} (9.141 sq mi)
- Elevation: 558 m (1,831 ft)

Population (2021)
  - Community: 200
  - Density: 8.4/km^{2} (22/sq mi)
- Time zone: UTC+2 (EET)
  - Summer (DST): UTC+3 (EEST)
- Postal code: 402 00
- Area code: +30-2493
- Vehicle registration: PI

Lofos (Greek: Λόφος, Greek pronunciation: ['lofos]) is a village and a community of the Elassona municipality. Before the 2011 local government reform it was a part of the municipality of Olympos. The community of Lofos covers an area of 23.674 km^{2}.

== History ==
The settlement was recorded as a village with the name Bazarlıfakih, in the Ottoman tahrir defter (number 101) of 1521. The village was known as Pazarládes (Παζαρλάδες) until 1957, when it was renamed to Lófos. Until the exchange of populations in 1924 and the arrival of the refugees from Pontus, mainly from Erbaa and Niksar, the village was inhabited by local Muslims.

== Administrative division ==
The community of Lofos consists of two settlements:

- Asprochoma
- Lofos

== Population ==
Historical population
Year	Pop.	±%
2001	262	—
2011	336	+28.2%
2021	200	−40.5%

== See also ==
- List of settlements in the Larissa regional unit
