= Petroto, Larissa =

Petroto Πετρωτό
- Settlement
- Location within Greece
- Coordinates: 39°58.8′N 22°9.3′E
- Country: Greece
- Administrative region: Thessaly
- Regional unit: Larissa
- Municipality: Elassona
- Municipal unit: Olympos
- Community: Kallithea Elassonos
- Elevation: 460 m (1,510 ft)

Population (2021)
  - Total: 40
- Time zone: UTC+2 (EET)
  - Summer (DST): UTC+3 (EEST)
- Postal code: 402 00
- Area code: +30-2493
- Vehicle registration: PI

Petroto (Greek: Πετρωτό, Greek pronunciation: [petɾo'to]) is a village of the Elassona municipality. Before the 2011 local government reform it was a part of the municipality of Olympos. The 2021 census recorded 40 inhabitants in the village. Petroto is a part of the community of Kallithea Elassonos.

== See also ==
- List of settlements in the Larissa regional unit
