= Kokkinopilos =

Kokkinopilos Κοκκινοπηλός
- Community
- Location within Greece
- Coordinates: 40°5.8′N 22°15.2′E
- Country: Greece
- Administrative region: Thessaly
- Regional unit: Larissa
- Municipality: Elassona
- Municipal unit: Olympos

Area
  - Community: 129.368 km^{2} (49.949 sq mi)
- Elevation: 1,135 m (3,724 ft)

Population (2021)
  - Community: 530
  - Density: 4.1/km^{2} (11/sq mi)
- Time zone: UTC+2 (EET)
  - Summer (DST): UTC+3 (EEST)
- Postal code: 402 00
- Area code: +30-2493
- Vehicle registration: PI

Kokkinopilos (Greek: Κοκκινοπηλός, Greek pronunciation: [kocinopi'los]) is a village and a community in Elassona Municipality, Greece. Before the 2011 local government reform it was a part of the municipality of Olympos. The community of Kokkinopilos covers an area of 129.368 km^{2}.

== Administrative division ==
The community of Kokkinopilos consists of two settlements:

- Kalyvia
- Kokkinopilos

== Population ==
Historical population
Year	Pop.	±%
2001	664	—
2011	592	−10.8%
2021	530	−10.5%

== History ==
Kokkinopilos was captured by the Ottomans in 1442 was administered as a chiflik. The settlement is recorded as village and as "Kokinopulo" in the Ottoman Tahrir Defter number 101 dating to 1521. After a failed revolt against the Ottoman authorities during the Greek War of Independence, the village was captured and looted by Ottoman troops.

During the Balkan Wars the advancing Greek army entered the village in 21 October 1912. During the Axis occupation of Greece the village was burned twice: in 1943 by the Italians and in 1944 by the Germans. The latter resulted to the scattering of the population of the village, in Katerini and Thessaloniki and to the establishment of Kalyvia as a permanent settlement.

== See also ==
- List of settlements in the Larissa regional unit
