= Flampouro, Larissa =

Flampouro Φλάμπουρο
- Community
- Location within Greece
- Coordinates: 39°58.2′N 22°15.2′E
- Country: Greece
- Administrative region: Thessaly
- Regional unit: Larissa
- Municipality: Elassona
- Municipal unit: Olympos

Area
  - Community: 58.72 km^{2} (22.67 sq mi)
- Elevation: 526 m (1,726 ft)

Population (2021)
  - Community: 202
  - Density: 3.44/km^{2} (8.91/sq mi)
- Time zone: UTC+2 (EET)
  - Summer (DST): UTC+3 (EEST)
- Postal code: 402 00
- Area code: +30-2493
- Vehicle registration: PI

Flampouro (Greek: Φλάμπουρο, Greek pronunciation: ['flabuɾo]) is a village and a community of the Elassona municipality. Before the 2011 local government reform it was a part of the municipality of Olympos. The community of Flampouro covers an area of 58.72 km^{2}.

== Administrative division ==
The community of Kallithea Elassonos consists of two settlements:

- Flampouro (population 115 as of 2021)
- Iera Moni Sparmou (Greek for Holy Monastery of Sparmos) (population 8)
- Skopia (population 79)

== Population ==
Historical population
Year	Pop.	±%
2001	423	—
2011	273	−35.5%
2021	202	−26.0%

== See also ==
- List of settlements in the Larissa regional unit
