= Asprochoma, Larissa =

Asprochoma Ασπρόχωμα
- Settlement
- Location within Greece
- Coordinates: 40°1′N 22°12′E
- Country: Greece
- Administrative region: Thessaly
- Regional unit: Larissa
- Municipality: Elassona
- Municipal unit: Olympos
- Community: Lofos
- Elevation: 590 m (1,940 ft)

Population (2021)
  - Total: 74
- Time zone: UTC+2 (EET)
  - Summer (DST): UTC+3 (EEST)
- Postal code: 402 00
- Area code: +30-2493
- Vehicle registration: PI

Asprochoma (Greek: Ασπρόχωμα, Greek pronunciation: [as'pɾoxoma]) is a village of the Elassona municipality. Before the 2011 local government reform it was part of the municipality of Olympos. The 2021 census recorded 74 inhabitants in the village. Asprochoma is a part of the community of Lofos.

== See also ==
- List of settlements in the Larissa regional unit
