= Pythio, Larissa =

Pythio Πύθιο
- Community

- Location within Greece
- Coordinates: 40°3.9′N 22°13.9′E
- Country: Greece
- Administrative region: Thessaly
- Regional unit: Larissa
- Municipality: Elassona
- Municipal unit: Olympos

Area
  - Community: 38.959 km^{2} (15.042 sq mi)
- Elevation: 720 m (2,360 ft)

Population (2021)
  - Community: 285
  - Density: 7.32/km^{2} (18.9/sq mi)
- Time zone: UTC+2 (EET)
  - Summer (DST): UTC+3 (EEST)
- Postal code: 402 00
- Area code: +30-2493
- Vehicle registration: PI

Pythio (Greek: Πύθιο, Greek pronunciation: ['piθio]) is a village and a community of the Elassona municipality. Before the 2011 local government reform it was a part of the municipality of Olympos, of which it was a municipal district. The community of Pythio covers an area of 38.959 km^{2}. The settlement was known as Selos (Σέλος) until 1928, when it was officially renamed Pythion (Πύθιον).

== Population ==
Historical population
Year	Pop.	±%
2001	650	—
2011	433	−33.4%
2021	285	−34.2%

== See also ==
- List of settlements in the Larissa regional unit
