= Elafos =

Elafos may refer to several places in Greece:

- Elafos, Ioannina, a village in the Dodoni
- Elafos, Larissa, a village in the Agia
- Elafos, Pieria, a village in the Katerini
