= Alexandrini =

Alexandrini Αλεξανδρινή
- Settlement
- Location within Greece
- Coordinates: 39°53.7′N 22°43.2′E
- Country: Greece
- Administrative region: Thessaly
- Regional unit: Larissa
- Municipality: Agia
- Municipal unit: Evrymenes
- Community: Palaiopyrgos
- Elevation: 5 m (16 ft)

Population (2021)
  - Total: 7
- Time zone: UTC+2 (EET)
  - Summer (DST): UTC+3 (EEST)
- Postal code: 400 07
- Area code: +30-2495
- Vehicle registration: PI

Alexandrini (Greek: Αλεξανδρινή, Greek pronunciation: [aleksandɾi'ni]) is a village of the Agia municipality. Before the 2011 local government reform it was a part of the municipality of Evrymenes. The 2021 census recorded 7 inhabitants in the village. Alexandrini is a part of the community of Palaiopyrgos.

== Geography ==
Alexandrini is a coastal village located near the delta of Pineios river.

== See also ==
- List of settlements in the Larissa regional unit
