= Rakopotamos (Larissa) =

Coordinates: 39.6435°N 22.8973°E

Rakopotamos (Greek: Ρακοπόταμος Λάρισας) is a beach of the municipal unit of Melivoia, Larissa, Greece.

The seaside settlement is away 8 km from Agiokampos and 15 km from Melivoia. The beach is sandy with some pebbles and the access to it is via two near paths leading to the beach, after the bridge of Rakopotamos.
