= Karitsa, Larissa =

Karitsa Καρίτσα
- Community
- Location within Greece
- Coordinates: 39°50.6′N 22°45.7′E
- Country: Greece
- Administrative region: Thessaly
- Regional unit: Larissa
- Municipality: Agia
- Municipal unit: Evrymenes

Area
  - Community: 23.241 km^{2} (8.973 sq mi)
- Elevation: 256 m (840 ft)

Population (2021)
  - Community: 491
  - Density: 21.1/km^{2} (54.7/sq mi)
- Time zone: UTC+2 (EET)
  - Summer (DST): UTC+3 (EEST)
- Postal code: 400 07
- Area code: +30-2495
- Vehicle registration: PI

Karitsa (Greek: Καρίτσα, Greek pronunciation: [ka'ɾit͡sa]) is a village and a community of the Agia municipality. Before the 2011 local government reform it was a part of the municipality of Evrymenes. The community of Karitsa covers an area of 23.241 km^{2}.

== Administrative division ==
The community of Palaiopyrgos consists of four separate settlements:

- Agia Paraskevi (population 9 in 2021)
- Karitsa (population 358)
- Kokkino Nero (population 116)
- Plateia Ammos (population 8)

== Geography ==
The village is located on the eastern slopes of Mount Ossa overseeing the Aegean Sea.

== Population ==
Historical population
Year	Pop.	±%
2001	620	—
2011	536	−13.5%
2021	491	−8.4%

== See also ==
- List of settlements in the Larissa regional unit
