= Palaiopyrgos, Larissa =

Palaiopyrgos Παλαιόπυργος
- Community
- Location within Greece
- Coordinates: 39°55.1′N 22°41′E
- Country: Greece
- Administrative region: Thessaly
- Regional unit: Larissa
- Municipality: Agia
- Municipal unit: Evrymenes

Area
  - Community: 11.678 km^{2} (4.509 sq mi)
- Elevation: 5 m (16 ft)

Population (2021)
  - Community: 123
  - Density: 10.5/km^{2} (27.3/sq mi)
- Time zone: UTC+2 (EET)
  - Summer (DST): UTC+3 (EEST)
- Postal code: 400 07
- Area code: +30-2495
- Vehicle registration: PI

Palaiopyrgos (Greek: Παλαιόπυργος, Greek pronunciation: [pale'opiɾɣos]) is a village and a community of the Agia municipality. Before the 2011 local government reform it was a part of the municipality of Evrymenes. The community of Palaiopyrgos covers an area of 11.678 km^{2}.

== Administrative division ==
The community of Palaiopyrgos consists of three separate settlements:

- Alexandrini (population 7 in 2021)
- Palaiopyrgos (population 116)
- Strintzios (uninhabited)

== Geography ==
The village is located on a plain run by Pineios river, located between Mount Ossa, and Mount Olympus.

== Population ==
Historical population
Year	Pop.	±%
2001	330	—
2011	244	−26.1%
2021	123	−49.6%

== See also ==
- List of settlements in the Larissa regional unit
