= Evrymenes =

Evrymenes may refer to:

- Evrymenes, Ioannina, a municipal unit in Ioannina regional unit, Greece
- Evrymenes, Larissa, a municipal unit in Larissa regional unit, Greece
- Eurymenae, an ancient Greek city in Thessaly
