= Omolio =

Omolio Ομόλιο
- Community
- Location within Greece
- Coordinates: 39°53.7′N 22°38.5′E
- Country: Greece
- Administrative region: Thessaly
- Regional unit: Larissa
- Municipality: Agia
- Municipal unit: Evrymenes

Area
  - Community: 22.38 km^{2} (8.64 sq mi)
- Elevation: 20 m (66 ft)

Population (2021)
  - Community: 484
  - Density: 21.6/km^{2} (56.0/sq mi)
- Time zone: UTC+2 (EET)
  - Summer (DST): UTC+3 (EEST)
- Postal code: 400 07
- Area code: +30-2495
- Vehicle registration: PI

Omolio (Greek: Ομόλιο, Greek pronunciation: [o'molio]) is a village and a community of the Agia municipality. Before the 2011 local government reform it was a part of the municipality of Evrymenes. The community of Omolio covers an area of 22.38 km^{2}. The site of ancient Homolium can be found within the bounds of the community.

== Geography ==
The village is located on a plain by the northern slopes of Mount Ossa, less than 1 km away from Pineios river.

== Population ==
Historical population
Year	Pop.	±%
2001	700	—
2011	606	−13.4%
2021	484	−20.1%

== See also ==
- List of settlements in the Larissa regional unit
