= Potamia =

Potamia may refer to the following places:

== In Cyprus ==
- Potamia, Cyprus (Turkish: Pattayam, Bodamya and Dereliköy), a village in the Nicosia district.

== In Greece ==
- Potamia, Achaea, a village in Achaea, part of the municipality Kalavryta
- Potamia, Agia, a municipal unit in the Larissa regional unit, part of the municipality Agia
- Potamia, Arcadia, a village in Arcadia, part of the municipality Megalopoli
- Potamia, Elassona, a municipal unit in the Larissa regional unit, part of the municipality Elassona
- Potamia, Evrytania, a municipal unit in Evrytania, part of the municipality Karpenisi
- Potamia, Ioannina, a village in the Ioannina regional unit, part of the municipality Zagori
- Potamia, Laconia, a village in Laconia, part of the municipality Sparti
- Potamia, Naxos, a village in the island of Naxos in the Cyclades
- Potamia, Thasos, a village in the island of Thasos
- Potamia, Xanthi, a village in the Xanthi regional unit, part of Nea Kessani
- Nea Potamia, a village in the island of Chios
- Skala Potamia, a village in the island of Thasos

== In Italy ==
- Potamia, a former town near San Luca, Calabria

== In Turkey ==
- Güneysu, a (formerly) Pontic Greek Muslim village in Rize Province, which retains its historical name Potamya in daily use by natives like president Erdogan.
