= Sotiritsa =

Sotiritsa Σωτηρίτσα
- Community
- Location within Greece
- Coordinates: 39°44′N 22°48′E
- Country: Greece
- Administrative region: Thessaly
- Regional unit: Larissa
- Municipality: Agia
- Municipal unit: Melivoia

Population (2021)
  - Community: 461
- Time zone: UTC+2 (EET)
  - Summer (DST): UTC+3 (EEST)

Sotiritsa (Greek: Σωτηρίτσα) is a village in the municipality of Agia, Larissa in the Larissa regional unit in Greece.

The old name of Sotiritsa is "Kapista". This name indicates the existence of a church in the area and as we can judge from the name the church must have been dedicated to Jesus Christ the Savior sotiras Christos. There is also another small meta-Byzantine church further north on the flat part of Ossa Mountain, that is dedicated to Christ Savior. Nevertheless, several findings in the area show that there must have been a post Byzantine monastery.

Kato Sotiritsa (Greek: Κάτω Σωτηρίτσα) is the seaside part of the area, which always attracts many people in summer time.
