= Strintzios =

Strintzios Στρίντζιος
- Settlement
- Location within Greece
- Coordinates: 39°54.8′N 22°42.6′E
- Country: Greece
- Administrative region: Thessaly
- Regional unit: Larissa
- Municipality: Agia
- Municipal unit: Evrymenes
- Community: Palaiopyrgos
- Elevation: 5 m (16 ft)

Population (2021)
  - Total: 0
- Time zone: UTC+2 (EET)
  - Summer (DST): UTC+3 (EEST)
- Postal code: 400 07
- Area code: +30-2495
- Vehicle registration: PI

Strintzios (Greek: Στρίντζιος, Greek pronunciation: ['stɾind͡zʝos]) is a village of the Agia municipality. The 2021 census recorded no permanent residents in the village. Strintzios is a part of the community of Palaiopyrgos.

== Geography ==
Strintzios is a coastal village located near the delta of the river Pineios.

== See also ==
- List of settlements in the Larissa regional unit
