= Lyciscus =

Lyciscus (Ancient Greek: Λυκίσκος) was the name of a number of people from classical antiquity:

- Lyciscus of Messenia, a figure in the First Messenian War in the 8th century BCE
- Lyciscus of Athens, Athenian demagogue in the 5th century BCE
- Lyciscus of Macedon, an officer of Cassander in the 4th century BCE
- Lyciscus (general), officer of Agathocles of Syracuse in the 4th century BCE
- Lyciscus of Acarnania, ambassador to Sparta in the 3rd century BCE
- Lyciscus of Aetolia, a partisan of Rome during the Third Macedonian War in the 2nd century BCE
- Lyciscus, a sculptor, whose age and country are unknown, though we know he must have lived in or before the 1st century CE, as he is mentioned by Pliny the Elder as having made "Lagonem puerum subdolae ac fucatae vernilitatis." (Pliny the Elder, Natural History 34.8. s. 19.17.)
