= Stomio, Larissa =

Stomio Στόμιο
- Community
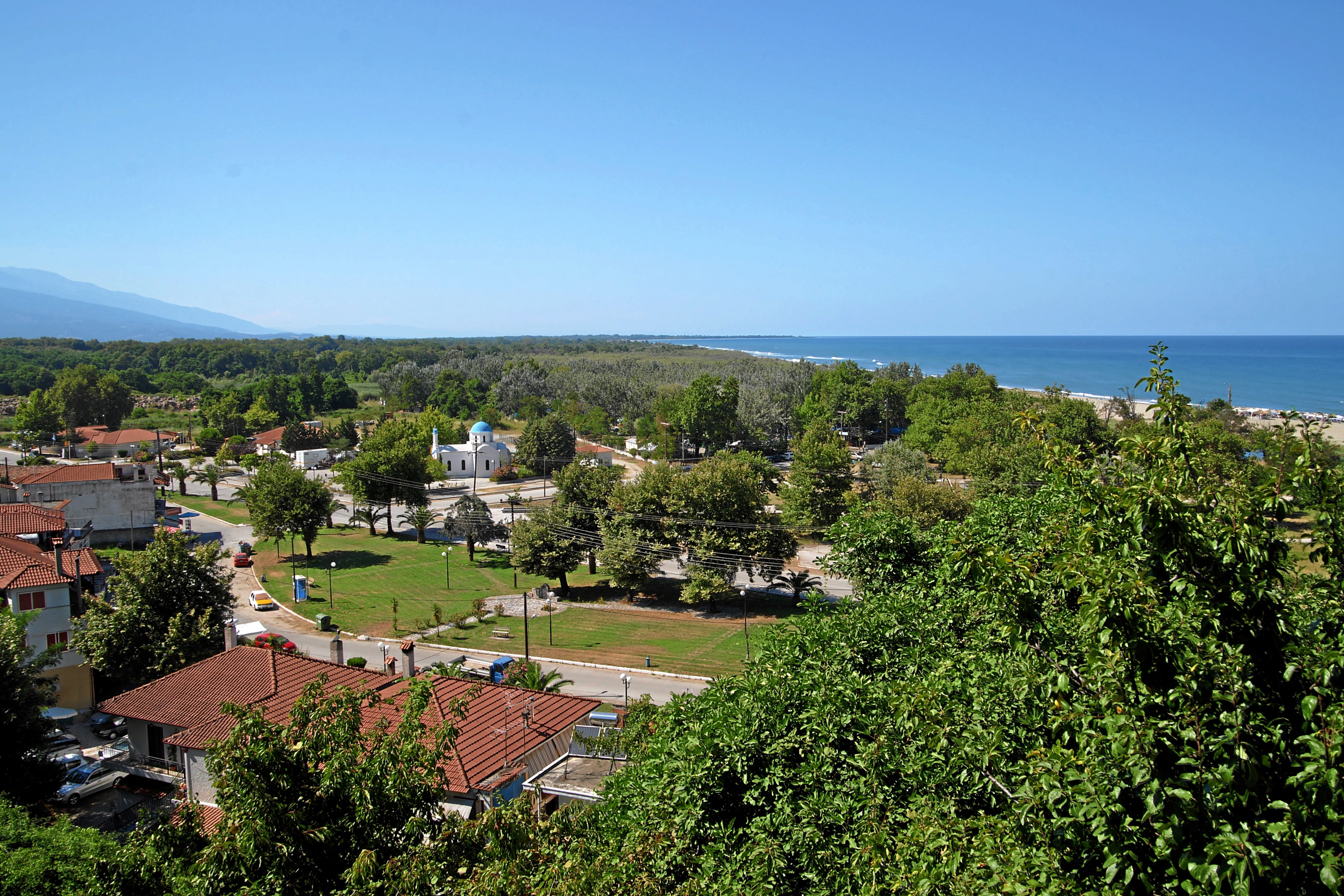

- Location within Greece
- Coordinates: 39°52′N 22°44′E
- Country: Greece
- Administrative region: Thessaly
- Regional unit: Larissa
- Municipality: Agia
- Municipal unit: Evrymenes

Area
  - Community: 37.985 km^{2} (14.666 sq mi)
- Elevation: 17 m (56 ft)

Population (2021)
  - Community: 478
  - Density: 12.6/km^{2} (32.6/sq mi)
- Time zone: UTC+2 (EET)
  - Summer (DST): UTC+3 (EEST)
- Postal code: 400 07
- Area code: +30-2495
- Vehicle registration: PI

Stomio (Greek: Στόμιο, Greek pronunciation: ['stomio]) is a village and a community of the Agia municipality. Before the 2011 local government reform it was the seat of the municipality of Evrymenes. The community of Stomio covers an area of 37.985 km^{2}.

== Geography ==
It is situated on the Aegean Sea coast, south of the mouth of the river Pineios, and at the foot of densely vegetated Mount Ossa. It is 13 km southeast of Pyrgetos, 17 km north of Agia and 37 km northeast of Larissa.

== History ==
The ancient city Eurymenae (also Erymnae) was situated near present Stomio. The Greek Orthodox Monastery of Saint Demetrius, situated on the mountain slope above Stomio, was founded in the 6th century and rebuilt in its present form in the 12th century by Byzantine emperor Alexios I Komnenos. Before 1927 Stomio was named Tsagezi (Greek: Τσάγεζι), deriving from the Turkish Çay ağzı which translates to "river mouth". (Çay = river, ağız = mouth, ağzı = the mouth).

== Population ==
Historical population
Year	Pop.	±%
1981	598	—
1991	649	+8.5%
2001	596	−8.2%
2011	553	−7.2%
2021	478	−13.6%

== See also ==
- List of settlements in the Larissa regional unit
