= Homolium =

Town and polis (city-state) of Magnesia in ancient Thessaly

Coordinates: 39°53′42″N 22°37′43″E

Map showing ancient Thessaly. Homolium is shown toward the upper right near the sea.

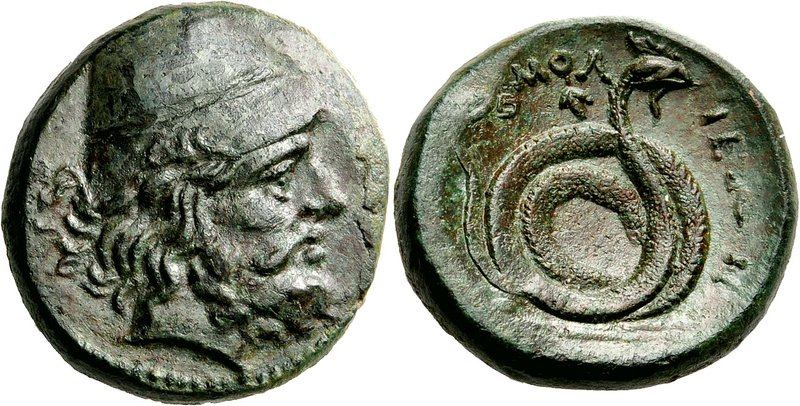
Coin, (tetrachalkon) of Homolium, 350 BC, depicting Philoktetes wearing conical pilos. Reverse: Coiled serpent, behind head, small bunch of grapes, ΟΜΟΛΙΕΩΝ "of Homolians"

Homolium or Homolion (Ancient Greek: Ὁμόλιον) or Homole (Ὁμόλη) was a town and polis (city-state) of Magnesia in ancient Thessaly, situated at the foot of Mount Homole, and near the edge of the vale of Tempe. Mt. Homole was the part of the chain of Ossa lying between Tempe and the modern village of Karitsa. Mt. Homole is sometimes used as synonymous with Ossa. It was celebrated as a favourite haunt of Pan, and as the abode of the Centaurs and the Lapithae. Pausanias describes it as the most fertile mountain in Thessaly, and well supplied with fountains.

Ancient authors differed in their descriptions of the town's location. Both Pseudo-Scylax and Strabo seem to place it on the right bank of the Peneius near the exit of the vale of Tempe, and consequently at some distance from the sea; but in Apollonius Rhodius and in the Orphic poems Homolium is described as situated near the sea-shore, and in Apollonius even another town, Eurymenae, is placed between Homolium and Tempe. Eurymenae, however, stood upon the coast more to the south.

Homolium minted coins dated to the 4th century BCE.

Homolium's site is at the modern village of Laspochori, in the municipal unit of Evrymenes.
