= Sklithro =

Sklithro may refer to several places in Greece:

- Sklithro, Florina, a village in the Florina regional unit
- Sklithro, Larissa, a village in the Larissa regional unit
- Sklithro, Phocis, a village in Phocis, part of the municipal unit Gravia
