= Nea Mesangala =

Settlement in Aigani, Greece

Coordinates: 39°57′N 22°42′E

Nea Mesangala or Nea Mesagala (Greek: Νέα Μεσάγκαλα, [ˈne.a meˈsaŋɡala]), often just called Mesangala, is one of two small beach settlements in the local community of Aigani in the historical and administrative region of Thessaly, Greece. Nea Mesangala has 331 inhabitants, as of 2021, and is located on the shores of the Thermaikos Gulf in the Larissa regional unit about 50 km (31 mi) from the regional unit's eponymous capital city. The second beach settlement of Aigani, Kastri-Loutro, is located just north of Nea Mesangala.

The seaside settlement is found in the Pineios river delta and is known for its wide and sandy beaches; its clean, calm waters; and its numerous beach bars and restaurants. The area around Mesangala has many natural beauties including protected wetlands and rivers as well as beach camping sites and hiking trails. Mount Olympus and its foothills are located to the northwest and Mount Kissavos to the southwest making the beaches at Nea Mesangala particularly lovely at sunset. Near by are the beautiful Vale of Tempi and the mountain village of Aigani. To the north is the region of Central Macedonia are the seaside towns of Platamona and Neoi Poroi.
