= Paliouria (Larissa) =

Beach in Melivoia, Greece

Coordinates: 39°48′28″N 22°49′51″E

Paliouria (Greek: Παλιουριά; also called Paliurgia, Παλιουργιά) is a beach in the regional unit of Melivoia.

The green of the forest coming down to the beach, with rocky complexes, creates a rare beauty image. In recent years, the area of Koutsoupias has developed enough in terms of tourism infrastructure.
