= Metaxochori =

Metaxochori Μεταξοχώρι
- Community
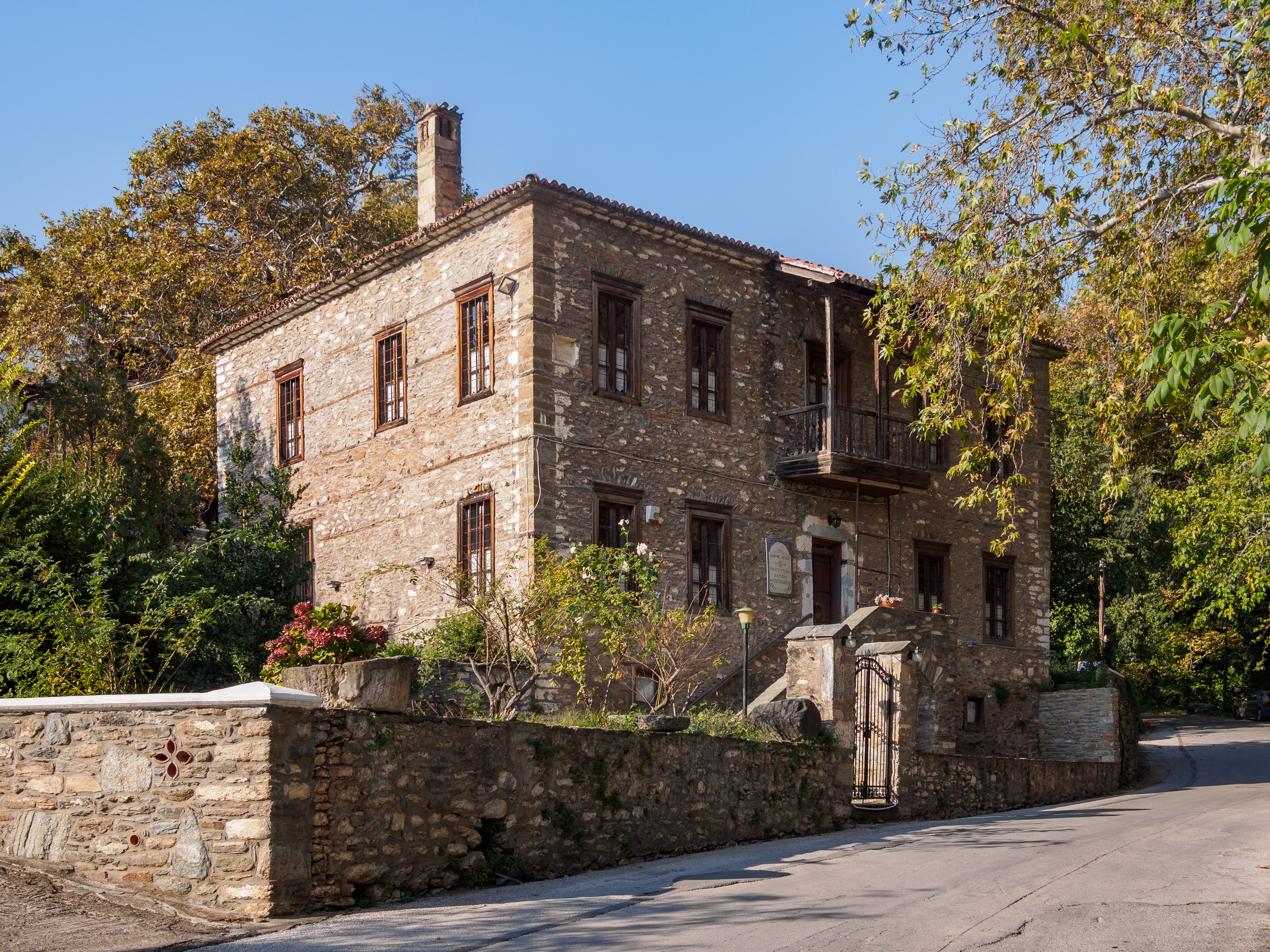

- Location within Greece
- Coordinates: 39°43.5′N 22°44.5′E
- Country: Greece
- Administrative region: Thessaly
- Regional unit: Larissa
- Municipality: Agia
- Municipal unit: Agia

Area
  - Community: 3.024 km^{2} (1.168 sq mi)
- Elevation: 300 m (980 ft)

Population (2021)
  - Community: 466
  - Density: 154/km^{2} (399/sq mi)
- Time zone: UTC+2 (EET)
  - Summer (DST): UTC+3 (EEST)
- Postal code: 400 03
- Area code: +30-2494
- Vehicle registration: PI

Metaxochori (Greek: Μεταξοχώρι, Greek pronunciation: [metakso'xoɾi]) is a village and a community of the Agia municipality. The community of Metaxochori covers an area of 3.024 km^{2}.

== Geography ==
Metaxochori is located two kilometres to the northwest of Agia, at the foot of Mount Ossa. The village is separated in two parts, with a small stream and a small bridge connecting each other.

== Economy ==
The inhabitants are principally engaged in the cultivation of apple and cherry and the area is known for its silk production.

== Population ==
Historical population
Year	Pop.	±%
2001	551	—
2011	478	−13.2%
2021	466	−2.5%

== See also ==
- List of settlements in the Larissa regional unit
