= Aigani =

Aigani Αιγάνη
- Community
- Location within Greece
- Coordinates: 39°57′10″N 22°37′40″E
- Country: Greece
- Administrative region: Thessaly
- Regional unit: Larissa
- Municipality: Tempi
- Municipal unit: Kato Olympos

Area
  - Community: 21.0 km^{2} (8.1 sq mi)
- Elevation: 192 m (630 ft)

Population (2021)
  - Community: 1,021
  - Density: 48.6/km^{2} (126/sq mi)
- Time zone: UTC+2 (EET)
  - Summer (DST): UTC+3 (EEST)
- Vehicle registration: PI

Aigani or Egani (/ɛˈɡɑːni/; Greek: Αιγάνη, [eˈɣani]) is a village and Local Community (Τοπική κοινότητα) located on the northeastern border of the historical and Administrative Region of Thessaly, Greece. Since Greece's local government reforms of 2011 the Local Community of Aigani is located in the municipal unit of Kato Olympos in the Tempi municipality within the Larissa Regional Unit of Thessaly. The Local Community of Aigani consists of five settlements. (Note: Prior to Greece's local government reform of 2011 the community of Aigani consisted of four settlements.)

== Etymology ==
The name Aigani can be roughly translated as 'the place of goats' and comes from the Greek: αιξ or αίγα (Note: Greek: αιξ, romanized: eks, pronounced [eks] Greek: αίγα, romanized: éga, pronounced [ˈe.ɣa]) which in turn derive directly from Ancient Greek: αἴξ/αἶγα (Note: Ancient Greek: αἴξ, romanized: aíks, pronounced [aí̯ks] Ancient Greek: αἶγα, romanized: aȋga, pronounced [aî̯.ga]) and mean 'nanny-goat.' Goats and sheep are raised by many in the village and their meat can be found in the village's taverns alongside traditionally made loukaniko, wine, and the tsipouro for which the village is known.

== Village of Aigani ==
The largest settlement in the community is the eponymous mountain village of Aigani. The village is located at an altitude of around 290 m (950 ft) on the southeastern face of the foothills of Mount Olympus (Note: These southern foothills are collectively known as Κάτο Όλυμπος, Káto Ólympos, lit. 'Lower Olympus') overlooking the Pineios river delta and Thermaikos Gulf. The area has been an active human settlement since at least the middle Byzantine period. The village is 10 km (6 mi) from the community's coastal settlements of Nea Mesangala and Kastri-Loutro, as well as the neighboring seaside towns of Platamona and Neoi Poroi. The cities of Larissa and Katerini are roughly 50 km (31 mi) to the southwest and north, respectively. As is typical for Greek mountain villages, Aigani is densely packed with winding, narrow streets. The village is centered on a town square, or platia (πλατεία), which has large sycamores and a fountain at its center. The square is surrounded taverns and shops, and is where many of Aigani's annual festivals and feasts take place. Aigani has sports facilities in the form of basketball, handball, and tennis courts as well as a football pitch which is home to the village's local football club. An outdoor theater constructed in 2016 hosts concerts and plays throughout the summer and serves as a venue for many local and regional summer festivals.

Aigani has several small churches throughout the village, the largest of which is the church of the Birth of the Virgin Mary. At the village's highest peak is the church of the Prophet Elias, with sweeping views of the valley below, the Olympian hills to the north, and Mount Kissavos to the south. One of the most historically important places in Aigani is the church of Saint Athanasios, which lies in a valley just north of the village. The church was built in the 14th century at the latest and is the oldest known church in all of Thessaly. Unfortunately the church is not well preserved and many of the ancient icons and paintings have disappeared or been damaged.

A small road towards the top of Aigani leads south through the mountains towards a monastery devoted to Nicodemus the Agiorite and continues on to the nearby villages of Krania and Rapsani.

== Local community of Aigani ==
Aigani is a semi-mountainous community with an area of just 23 km^{2} (9 sq mi) that is defined by mountain, farmland, and sea. The quickly growing beach towns of Nea Mesangala and Kastri-Loutro have 498 inhabitants and lie on the sandy beaches formed by the Pineios river delta and are renowned in Greece for their wide dunes; their warm, shallow, and calm waters; and their inexpensive beach bars, taverns, and hotels. Directly below the village of Aigani, along the A1 motorway, are the small settlements of Kato Aigani (Κάτο Αιγάνη, lit. 'lower Aigani') and Papapouli (Παπαπούλι) which collectively have 101 inhabitants.

Until the end of the Balkan Wars in 1913, the northern border of Thessaly marked the end of free Greece. Aigani was therefore the final community before entering Ottoman occupied Greece and was known as a safe haven by those fleeing Ottoman persecution. A cement pillar marking this border can still be found on the hill of Prophet Elias in Aigani.

== Demographics ==
Population of the community of Aigani
Year	Pop.	±%
1961	1,082	—
1971	898	−17.0%
1981	913	+1.7%
1991	878	−3.8%
2001	857	−2.4%
2011	1,134	+32.3%
2021	1,021	−10.0%
Source: Population censuses

Settlement Populations in the Community of Aigani
Settlement	Pop. 1991	Pop 2001	Pop 2011	Pop 2021
Aigani	694	558	535	487
Kato Aigani	105	77	98	109
Papapouli	7	23	3	15
Nea Mesangala	72	199	388	331
Kastri-Loutro (Note: Prior to Greece's local government reform of 2011 Kastri-Loutro was counted as part of Nea Mesangala.)			110	79
Total	878	857	1,134	1,021

== See also ==
- Platamona
- Neoi Poroi
- Rapsani
