= Myrae =

Ancient town of Greece

Myrae or Myrai (Ancient Greek: Μύραι) was a town of Magnesia, ancient Thessaly, on the Aegean coast between Eurymenae and Homolion. Eurymenae was located between Rhizus and Myrae.

The town's location has not been ascertained.
