= Tsayezi =

The toponym Tsayezi was used in the past to denote two different localities in modern Greece:

- The village of Stomio, in Larisa regional unit.
- The harbor of Amphipolis, in Serres regional unit.

Etymology: From Turkish Çay ağzı = The river mouth. Çay = creek, small river, ağız = mouth, ağzı = the mouth
