= Kastri-Loutro =

Settlement in Aigani, Greece

Kastri-Loutro Καστρί-Λουτρό
- Beach settlement
- Location in Greece
- Coordinates: 39°57′54″N 22°40′51″E
- Country: Greece
- Region: Thessaly
- Regional unit: Larissa
- Municipality: Tempi
- Local community: Aigani

Population (2021)
  - Total: 79
- Time zone: UTC+2 (EET)
  - Summer (DST): UTC+3 (EEST)
- Website: mesagalakastri.gr

Kastri-Loutro (Greek: Καστρί-Λουτρό, lit. 'Castle's Bath' [kaˈstɾi luˈtɾo]) is one of two beach settlements in the local community of Aigani in the historical and administrative region of Thessaly, Greece. In 2021 it had 79 inhabitants. Kastri-Loutro is located in the Pineios river delta on the shores of the Thermaikos Gulf in the Larissa regional unit about 50 km from the city of Larissa. The second beach settlement of Aigani, called Nea Mesangala, is located just south of Kastri-Loutro.

Kastri-Loutro is known for its many beach bars and taverns as well as its clean, sandy beaches. Beautiful views of Mount Olympos, Mount Ossa, and the Platamona Castle which are found to the north and west make the beaches at Kastri-Loutro particularly beautiful at sunset. The beautiful Vale of Tempi is found nearby as is the mountain village of Aigani. The sea side towns of Platamona and Neoi Poroi are found just to the north in the administrative region of Central Macedonia.
