= Platia Ammos =

Beach in Greece

Coordinates: 39°50′23″N 22°47′4″E

Platia Ammos is a beach in the prefecture of Larissa of the Thessaly region in Greece.

The beach is adjacent to Kokkino Nero. It continues uphill and eventually meets the Stomio Beach.

The beach's primary attraction are its large trees affording visitors shade. A primary tourist attraction are black and white pebbles adorning the sand, as well.
