= Agiokampos =

Agiokampos (Greek: Αγιόκαμπος) may refer to several places in Greece:

- Agiokampos, Euboea, a village in the Euboea prefecture
- Agiokampos, Larissa, a village in the Larissa Prefecture
