= Skiti, Larissa =

Skiti Σκήτη
- Community
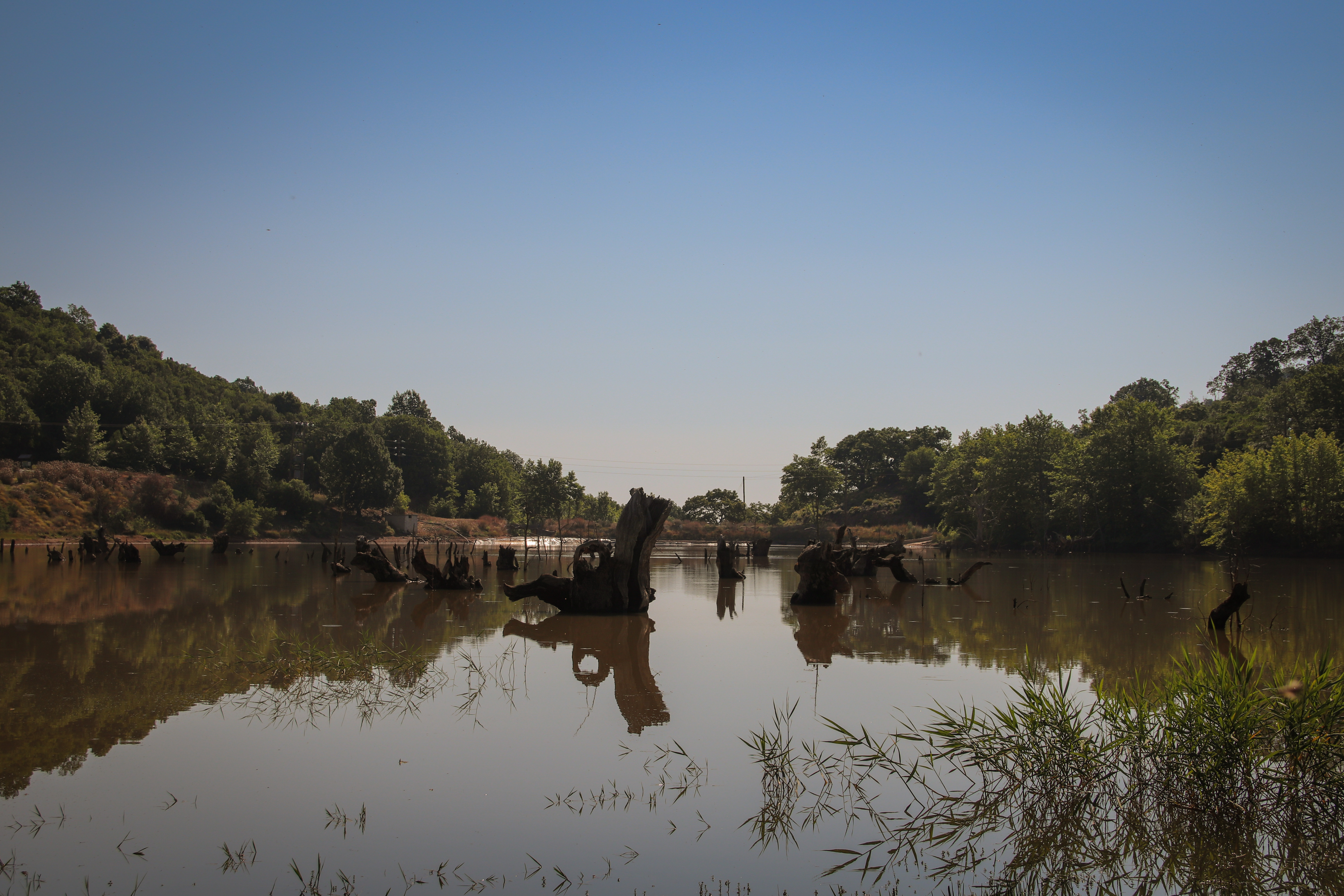
- Skiti lake

- Location within Greece
- Coordinates: 39°40′55″N 22°49′34″E
- Country: Greece
- Administrative region: Thessaly
- Regional unit: Larissa
- Municipality: Agia
- Municipal unit: Melivoia

Population (2021)
  - Community: 576
- Time zone: UTC+2 (EET)
  - Summer (DST): UTC+3 (EEST)

Skiti (Greek: Σκήτη) is a village and a community in the municipality of Agia, in the Larissa regional unit in Greece. The community includes the villages Agiokampos, Kato Polydendri and Metochia. The name of this village refers to the place that the monks lived alone away from public view. According to historic research, the ancient Melivoia was situated close to Kato Polydendri or Skiti. The ancient Melivoia was the metropolis of Philoctetes and very popular for the deep red (Purpura Meliboiae) dying of drapery. The ancient city is placed in the south firth of the Bourboulithra stream. In the northwest of Skiti there are the ruins of a fort which most probably belonged to the Byzantine city of Kentavroupoli. About 1 kilometer Northwest of Skiti, (on the new road that leads from Larissa to Agiokampos) is the monastery of mount Kelli, called Sts. Anargiroi. The monastery includes two "chambers" for the monks to leave in. The mural was created between 12th and 16th century.

South of the village, stretching from Kato Polydendri on the coast to the peaks of Mavrovouni (altitude 1,053 m.), lies the 34,791-acre Forest Estate of Polydendri, which was originally an estate of the Ottoman Mehmet Tevfik Bey Efedin until the annexation of Thessaly to the Greek state in 1881, after which it was acquired by the Greek royal family. Since 1994, it has been owned and managed by the Greek state.
