= Kokkino Nero =

Kokkino Nero Κόκκινο Νερό
- Settlement
- Location within Greece
- Coordinates: 39°49′58″N 22°47′32″E
- Country: Greece
- Administrative region: Thessaly
- Regional unit: Larissa
- Municipality: Agia
- Municipal unit: Evrymenes
- Community: Karitsa

Population (2021)
  - Total: 116
- Time zone: UTC+2 (EET)
  - Summer (DST): UTC+3 (EEST)
- Vehicle registration: ΡΡ

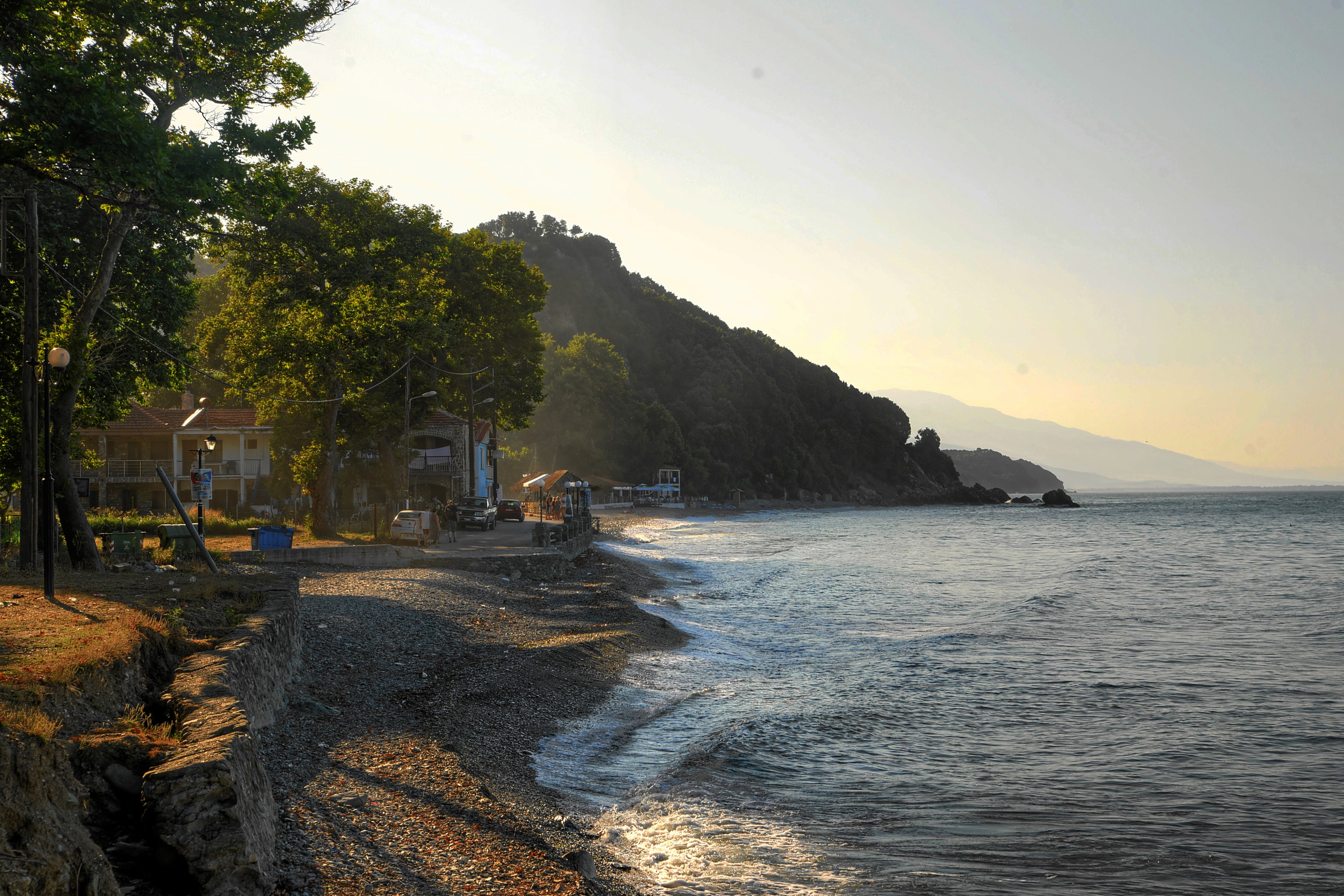
Local beach

Kokkino Nero (Greek: Κόκκινο Νερό) is a village and beach located at the foot of Mount Ossa in the community of Karitsa, municipal unit of Evrymenes, municipality of Agia, Larissa, Thessaly, Greece. The name, which means "Red Water", is derived from the hot springs in the area, which are colored by mineral salts. As of the 2021 census, the village had a population of 116. Within its bounds is the site of the ancient town of Eurymenae.
