= Prinias, Larissa =

Prinias Πρινιάς
- Settlement
- Location within Greece
- Coordinates: 39°39.2′N 22°42.9′E
- Country: Greece
- Administrative region: Thessaly
- Regional unit: Larissa
- Municipality: Agia
- Municipal unit: Agia
- Community: Anavra
- Elevation: 100 m (330 ft)

Population (2021)
  - Total: 63
- Time zone: UTC+2 (EET)
  - Summer (DST): UTC+3 (EEST)
- Postal code: 400 03
- Area code: +30-2492
- Vehicle registration: PI

Prinias (Greek: Πρινιάς, Greek pronunciation: [pɾi'ɲas]) is a village in the municipality of Agia. Before the 1997 local government reform it was a part of the community of Anavra. The 2021 census recorded 63 inhabitants in the village.

== See also ==
- List of settlements in the Larissa regional unit
