= Megalovryso =

Megalovryso Μεγαλόβρυσο
- Community
- Location within Greece
- Coordinates: 39°44.3′N 22°45.2′E
- Country: Greece
- Administrative region: Thessaly
- Regional unit: Larissa
- Municipality: Agia
- Municipal unit: Agia

Area
  - Community: 17.128 km^{2} (6.613 sq mi)
- Elevation: 600 m (2,000 ft)

Population (2021)
  - Community: 287
  - Density: 16.8/km^{2} (43.4/sq mi)
- Time zone: UTC+2 (EET)
  - Summer (DST): UTC+3 (EEST)
- Postal code: 400 03
- Area code: +30-24940
- Vehicle registration: ΡΙ

Megalovryso (Greek: Μεγαλόβρυσο, Greek pronunciation: [meɣa'lovɾiso]), known before 1927 as Nivoliani (Greek: Νιβόλιανη), is a village and a community of the Agia municipality. The community of Megalovryso covers an area of 17.128 km^{2}.

== Population ==
Historical population
Year	Pop.	±%
2001	438	—
2011	199	−54.6%
2021	287	+44.2%

== See also ==
- List of settlements in the Larissa regional unit
