= Anavra, Larissa =

Anavra Ανάβρα
- Community
- Location within Greece
- Coordinates: 39°40.8′N 22°42′E
- Country: Greece
- Administrative region: Thessaly
- Regional unit: Larissa
- Municipality: Agia
- Municipal unit: Agia

Area
  - Community: 23.244 km^{2} (8.975 sq mi)
- Elevation: 82 m (269 ft)

Population (2021)
  - Community: 593
  - Density: 25.5/km^{2} (66.1/sq mi)
- Time zone: UTC+2 (EET)
  - Summer (DST): UTC+3 (EEST)
- Postal code: 400 03
- Area code: +30-2494
- Vehicle registration: PI

Anavra (Greek: Ανάβρα, Greek pronunciation: [a'navɾa]) is a village and a community of the Agia municipality. The community of Anavra covers an area of 23.244 km^{2}.

== Administrative division ==
The community of Anavra consists of two separate settlements:

- Anavra
- Prinias

== Population ==
Historical population
Year	Pop.	±%
2001	670	—
2011	678	+1.2%
2021	593	−12.5%

== See also ==
- List of settlements in the Larissa regional unit
