= Neromyloi, Larissa =

Neromyloi Νερόμυλοι
- Community
- Location within Greece
- Coordinates: 39°42.9′N 22°44′E
- Country: Greece
- Administrative region: Thessaly
- Regional unit: Larissa
- Municipality: Agia
- Municipal unit: Agia

Area
  - Community: 4.698 km^{2} (1.814 sq mi)
- Elevation: 200 m (660 ft)

Population (2021)
  - Community: 256
  - Density: 54.5/km^{2} (141/sq mi)
- Time zone: UTC+2 (EET)
  - Summer (DST): UTC+3 (EEST)
- Postal code: 400 03
- Area code: +30-2494
- Vehicle registration: PI

Neromyloi (Greek: Νερόμυλοι, Greek pronunciation: [ne'ɾomili]) is a village and a community of the Agia municipality. The community of Neromyloi covers an area of 4.698 km^{2}.

== Population ==
Historical population
Year	Pop.	±%
2001	352	—
2011	261	−25.9%
2021	256	−1.9%

== See also ==
- List of settlements in the Larissa regional unit
