= Exochi, Pieria =

Exochi Εξοχή
- Community
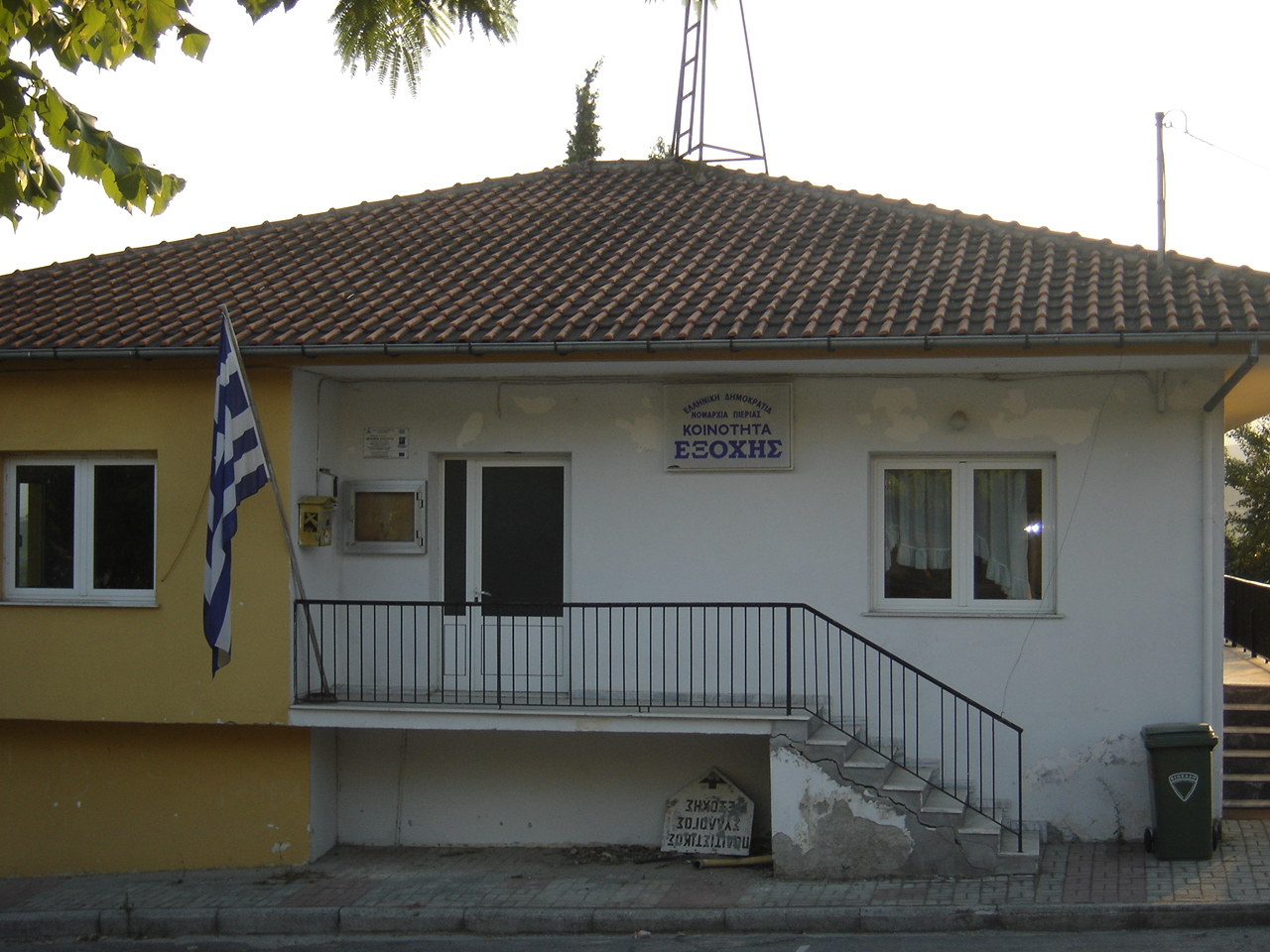
- The community hall of Exochi

- Location within Greece
- Coordinates: 40°21′N 22°26′E
- Country: Greece
- Administrative region: Central Macedonia
- Regional unit: Pieria
- Municipality: Katerini
- Municipal unit: Elafina
- Elevation: 286 m (938 ft)

Population (2021)
  - Community: 479
- Time zone: UTC+2 (EET)
  - Summer (DST): UTC+3 (EEST)
- Postal code: 601 00
- Area code: +30-2351
- Vehicle registration: KN

Exochi (Greek: Εξοχή, pronounced [e̞kso̞ˈçi]) is a village and a community of the Katerini municipality of Greece. Before the 2011 local government reform it was part of the municipality of Elafina, of which it was a municipal district. The 2021 census recorded 479 residents in the community, which includes the village of Toxo.

== See also ==
- List of settlements in the Pieria regional unit
