= Melivoia, Larissa =

Melivoia Μελίβοια
- Municipal unit
- Location within the regional unit

- Location within Greece
- Coordinates: 39°45′N 22°48′E
- Country: Greece
- Administrative region: Thessaly
- Regional unit: Larissa
- Municipality: Agia

Area
  - Municipal unit: 197.633 km^{2} (76.307 sq mi)
  - Community: 82.858 km^{2} (31.992 sq mi)
- Elevation: 329 m (1,079 ft)

Population (2021)
  - Municipal unit: 2,391
  - Municipal unit density: 12.10/km^{2} (31.33/sq mi)
  - Community: 1,245
  - Community density: 15.03/km^{2} (38.92/sq mi)
- Time zone: UTC+2 (EET)
  - Summer (DST): UTC+3 (EEST)
- Postal code: 400 03
- Vehicle registration: ΡΙ

Melivoia (Greek: Μελίβοια) is a town and a former municipality in the Larissa regional unit, Thessaly, Greece. Since the 2011 local government reform it is part of the municipality Agia, of which it is a municipal unit. The municipal unit has an area of 197.633 km^{2}. The seat of the municipality was in Kato Sotiritsa. Melivoia is located east of Larissa, the capital of the regional unit and Thessaly, and a few kilometers north of Agia. The municipal unit stretches along the Aegean Sea coast, at the foot of Mount Ossa. It was named after the ancient city Meliboea. The municipal unit borders on Magnesia to the southeast.

== Subdivisions ==
The municipal unit Melivoia is subdivided into the following communities (constituent villages in brackets):

- Melivoia (Melivoia, Velika, Kokkino Nero, Koutsoupia, Paliouria)
- Skiti (Skiti, Agiokampos, Kato Polydendri)
- Sklithro (Isiomata, Rakopotamos)
- Sotiritsa (Sotiritsa, Kato Sotiritsa)

== Population ==
Year	Settlement population	Community population	Municipal unit population
1981	1,926	-	-
1991	1,629	-	3,278
2001	1,344	1,898	3,472
2011	805	1,173	2,195
2021	847	1,245	2,391

== See also ==
- List of settlements in the Larissa regional unit
