= Kato Olympos =

Kato Olympos Κάτω Όλυμπος
- Municipal unit
- Location within the regional unit

- Location within Greece
- Coordinates: 39°55′N 22°35′E
- Country: Greece
- Administrative region: Thessaly
- Regional unit: Larissa
- Municipality: Tempi

Area
  - Municipal unit: 128.5 km^{2} (49.6 sq mi)

Population (2021)
  - Municipal unit: 3,196
  - Municipal unit density: 24.87/km^{2} (64.42/sq mi)
- Time zone: UTC+2 (EET)
  - Summer (DST): UTC+3 (EEST)
- Vehicle registration: ΡΙ

Kato Olympos (Greek: Κάτω Όλυμπος, lit. 'Lower Olympos') is a municipal unit in the Tempi municipality, within the regional unit of Larissa, in the historical and administrative region of Thessaly, Greece. (Note: Prior to Greece's 2011 local government reforms, Koto Olympos was its own municipality. As part of those reforms it was combined with the municipalities of Ampelakia, Gonnoi, Makrychori, and Nessonas to form the new municipality of Tempi.) Kato Olympos has, as of 2021, a population of 3,196 inhabitants. The municipal unit has an area of 128.462 km^{2} (49.599 mi^{2}). The seat of the municipal unit is located in Pyrgetos, the largest of its four 'Local Communities' (τοπική κοινότητα):

- Pyrgetos (Πυργετός; population 1,373)
- Aigani (Αιγάνη; population 1,021)
- Rapsani (Ραψάνη; population 505)
- Krania (Κρανιά; population 297)

Kato Olympos contains on the southernmost faces of the foothills of Mt. Olympos and most of the Pineios river delta where the river enters the Thermaikos Gulf. The municipal unit also contains the northern half of the Vale of Tempi a narrow gorge formed by the Pineios which was the site of an important battle during the Second World War.
