= Ossa Cave =

Cave in Mount Ossa, Greece

Ossa Cave is a cave on Mount Ossa in Greece. The cave contained ancient inscriptions, which were dedications to the Nymphs. The cave is located about an hour's walk north-west of Spilia.

== In literature ==
The Cave of Ossa, is mentioned in the book De mundo, on page 1. An archaeology expedition, reviewed in an article from 1909 discussed, A Cave of the Nymphs on Mount Ossa. The cave is mentioned in Stable Places and Changing Perceptions: Cave Archaeology in Greece (2013).
