= Meliadi =

Meliadi Μελιάδι
- Settlement
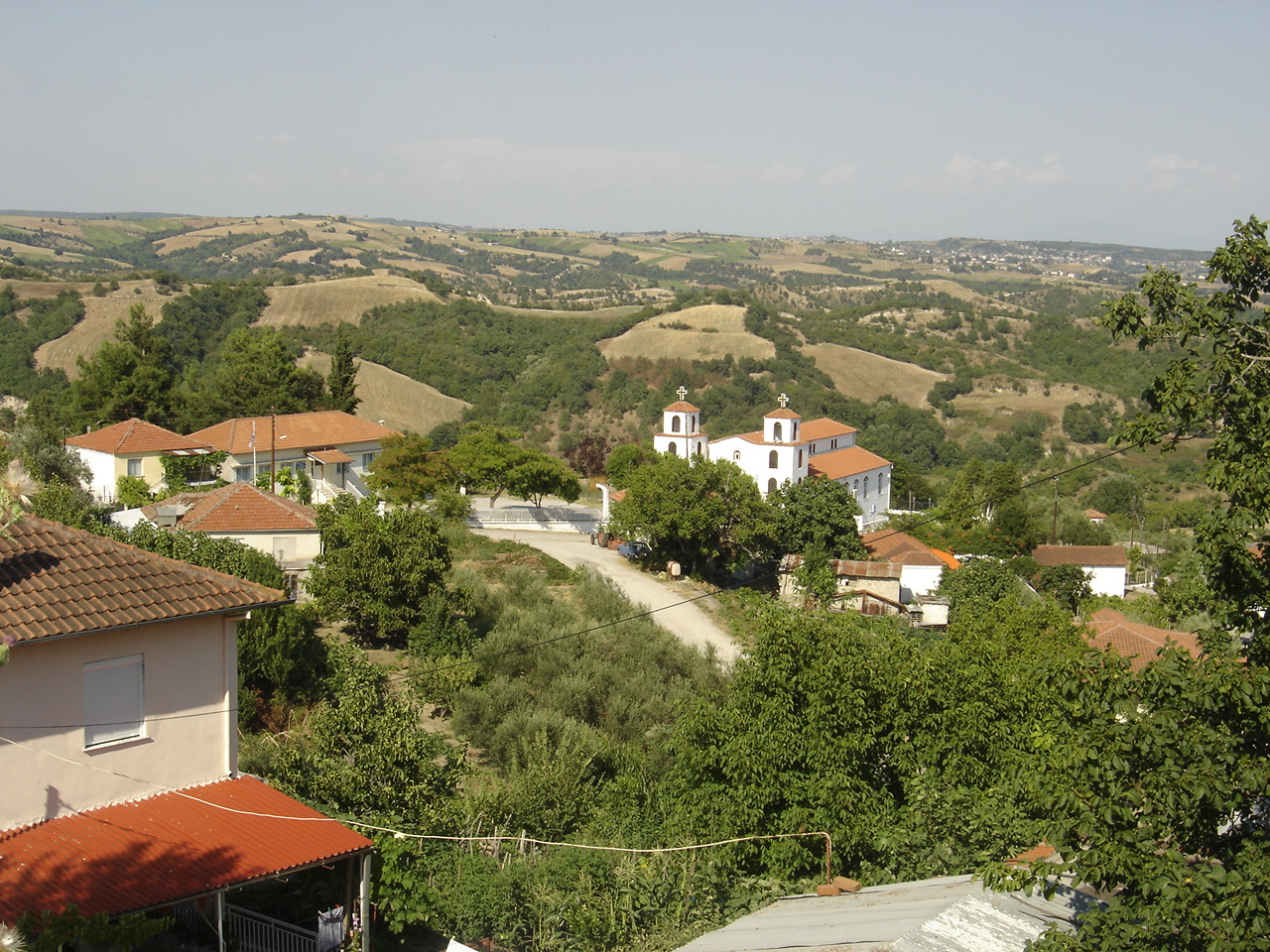
- A view of Meliadi

- Location within Greece
- Coordinates: 40°19′N 22°21′E
- Country: Greece
- Administrative region: Central Macedonia
- Regional unit: Pieria
- Municipality: Katerini
- Municipal unit: Elafina
- Community: Lagorrachi
- Elevation: 350 m (1,150 ft)

Population (2021)
  - Total: 82
- Time zone: UTC+2 (EET)
  - Summer (DST): UTC+3 (EEST)
- Postal code: 601 00
- Area code: +30-2351
- Vehicle registration: KN

Meliadi (Greek: Μελιάδι) is a village and a part of the community of Lagorrachi. Before the 2011 local government reform it was part of the municipality of Elafina. The 2021 census recorded 82 inhabitants in the village.

== See also ==
- List of settlements in the Pieria regional unit
