= Lakereia =

Lakereia Λακέρεια
- Municipal unit
- Location within the regional unit

- Location within Greece
- Coordinates: 39°41′N 22°38′E
- Country: Greece
- Administrative region: Thessaly
- Regional unit: Larissa
- Municipality: Agia

Area
  - Municipal unit: 179.386 km^{2} (69.261 sq mi)

Population (2021)
  - Municipal unit: 1,278
  - Municipal unit density: 7.124/km^{2} (18.45/sq mi)
- Time zone: UTC+2 (EET)
  - Summer (DST): UTC+3 (EEST)
- Vehicle registration: ΡΙ

Lakereia (Greek: Λακέρεια) is a former municipality in the Larissa regional unit, Thessaly, Greece. It was named after the ancient city of "Lakèreia". Since the 2011 local government reform it is part of the municipality Agia, of which it is a municipal unit. Population 1,278 (2021). The seat of the municipality was in Dimitra. The municipal unit has an area of 179.386 km^{2}.
