= Evrymenes, Larissa =

Evrymenes Ευρυμενές
- Municipal unit
- Location within the regional unit

- Location within Greece
- Coordinates: 39°52′N 22°44′E
- Country: Greece
- Administrative region: Thessaly
- Regional unit: Larissa
- Municipality: Agia

Area
  - Municipal unit: 95.28 km^{2} (36.79 sq mi)

Population (2021)
  - Municipal unit: 1,576
  - Municipal unit density: 16.54/km^{2} (42.84/sq mi)
- Time zone: UTC+2 (EET)
  - Summer (DST): UTC+3 (EEST)
- Postal code: 400 07
- Area code: 24950
- Vehicle registration: ΡΙ

Evrymenes (Greek: Ευρυμενές) is a former municipality in the Larissa regional unit, Thessaly, Greece. Since the 2011 local government reform it is part of the municipality Agia, of which it is a municipal unit. The municipal unit has an area of 95.284 km ^{2} (36.79 sq mi). The seat of the municipality was in Stomio. It was named after the ancient city Eurymenae.

== Geography ==
The municipal unit Evrymenes stretches along the Aegean Sea coast, south of the mouth of the river Pineios. It lies at the foot of the densely forested Mount Ossa.

== History ==
The most important ancient cities of Magnesia in the area of the municipal unit of Evrymenes were Eurymenae (near the modern village Kokkino Nero), Homolium (Homolion, at Lapsokhori, near the modern village Omolio) and Rhizus (Rhizous, near the modern village Tarsanas).

== Subdivisions ==
The municipal unit Evrymenes is subdivided into the following communities (constituent villages in brackets):

- Karitsa (Karitsa, Kokkino Nero, Plateia Ammos)
- Omolio
- Palaiopyrgos (Palaiopyrgos, Alexandrini)
- Stomio (Stomio, Apostolos Pavlos, Monastery of Saint Demetrius)

== Population ==
Historical population
Year	Pop.	±%
1991	2,522	—
2001	2,246	−10.9%
2011	1,939	−13.7%
2021	1,576	−18.7%
