= Palaio Keramidi =

Palaio Keramidi Παλαιό Κεραμίδι
- Community
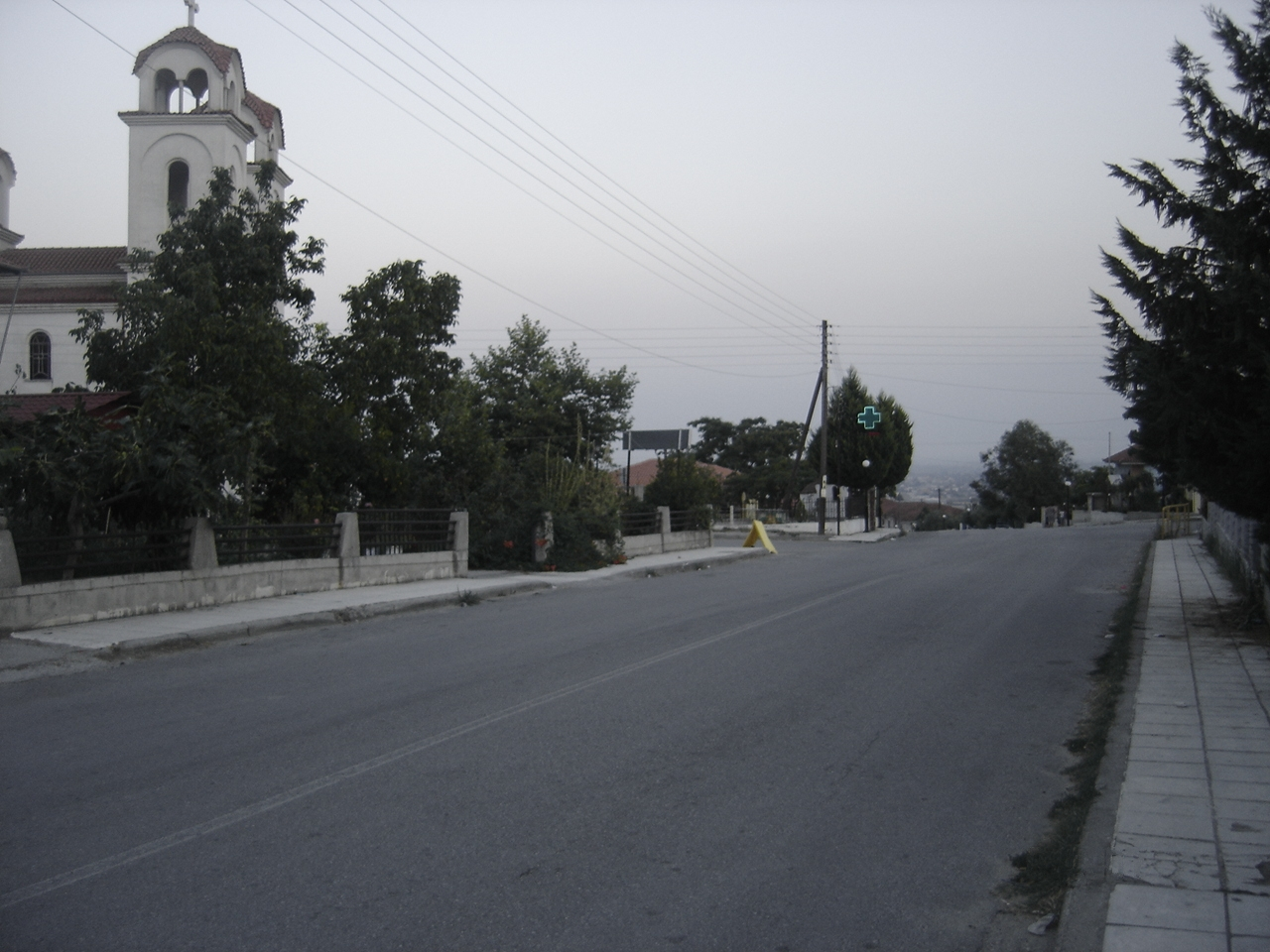
- The main street of Palaio Keramidi

- Location within Greece
- Coordinates: 40°19′N 22°28′E
- Country: Greece
- Administrative region: Central Macedonia
- Regional unit: Pieria
- Municipality: Katerini
- Municipal unit: Elafina
- Elevation: 150 m (490 ft)

Population (2021)
  - Community: 795
- Time zone: UTC+2 (EET)
  - Summer (DST): UTC+3 (EEST)
- Postal code: 601 00
- Area code: +30-2351
- Vehicle registration: KN

Palaio Keramidi (Greek: Παλιό Κεραμίδι) is a village and a community of the Katerini municipality. Before the 2011 local government reform it was part of the municipality of Elafina, of which it was also the seat. The 2021 census recorded 795 inhabitants in the village.
