= Aronas =

Village in Pieria, Greece

Aronas Αρωνάς
- Community
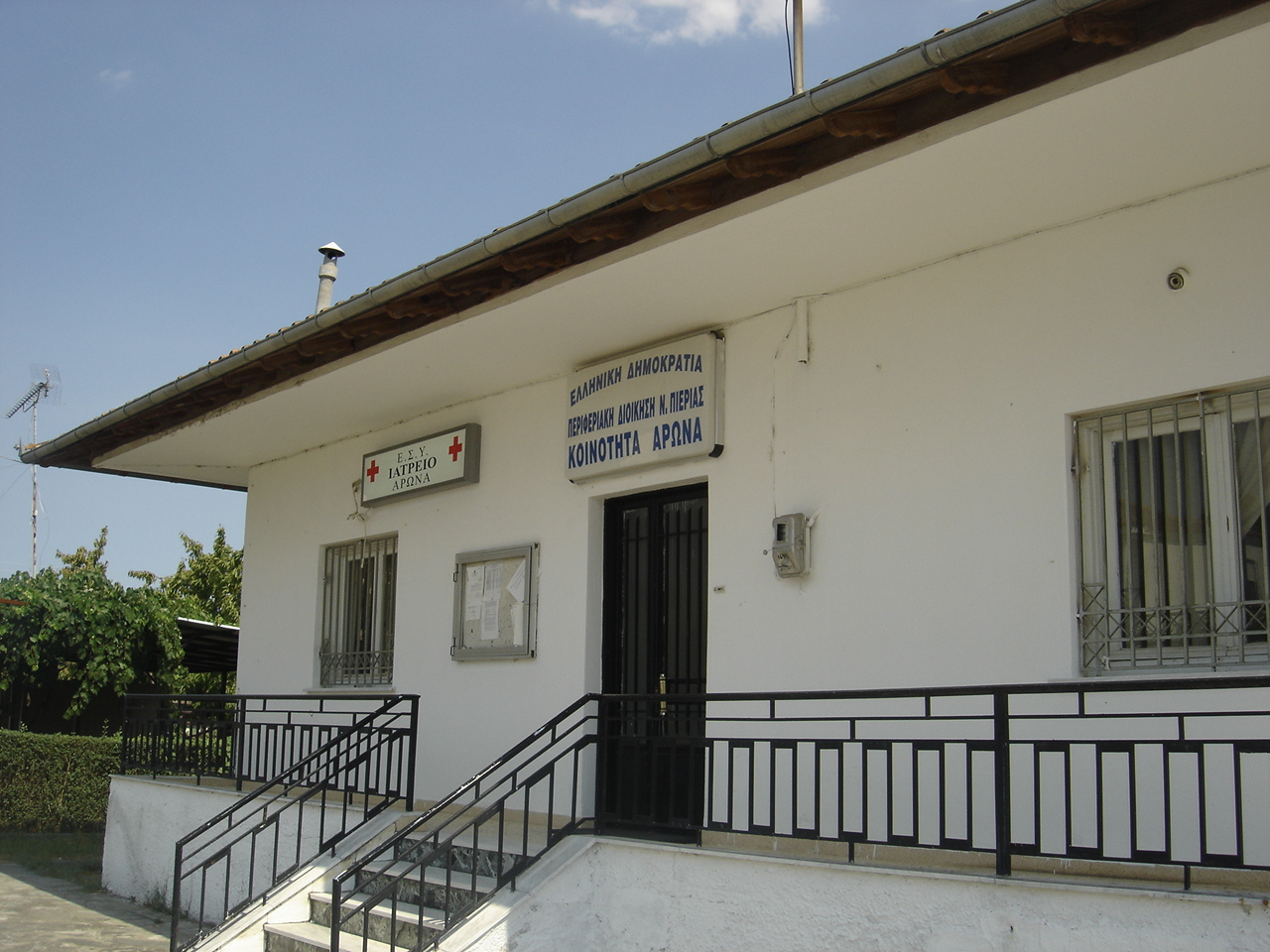
- The community hall of Aronas

- Location within Greece
- Coordinates: 40°17.5′N 22°26′E
- Country: Greece
- Administrative region: Central Macedonia
- Regional unit: Pieria
- Municipality: Katerini
- Municipal unit: Elafina
- Elevation: 95 m (312 ft)

Population (2021)
  - Community: 292
- Time zone: UTC+2 (EET)
  - Summer (DST): UTC+3 (EEST)
- Postal code: 601 00
- Area code: 23510
- Vehicle registration: KN

Aronas (Greek: Αρωνάς) is a village in the Pieria regional unit of Central Macedonia, Greece. Administratively, it is a community of the municipality of Katerini, while before the 2011 local government reform it was a municipal district of the municipality of Elafina. It has a population of 292 according to the 2021 census.
