= Katalonia =

Village in the Katerini municipality, Greece

Katalonia Καταλώνια
- Community
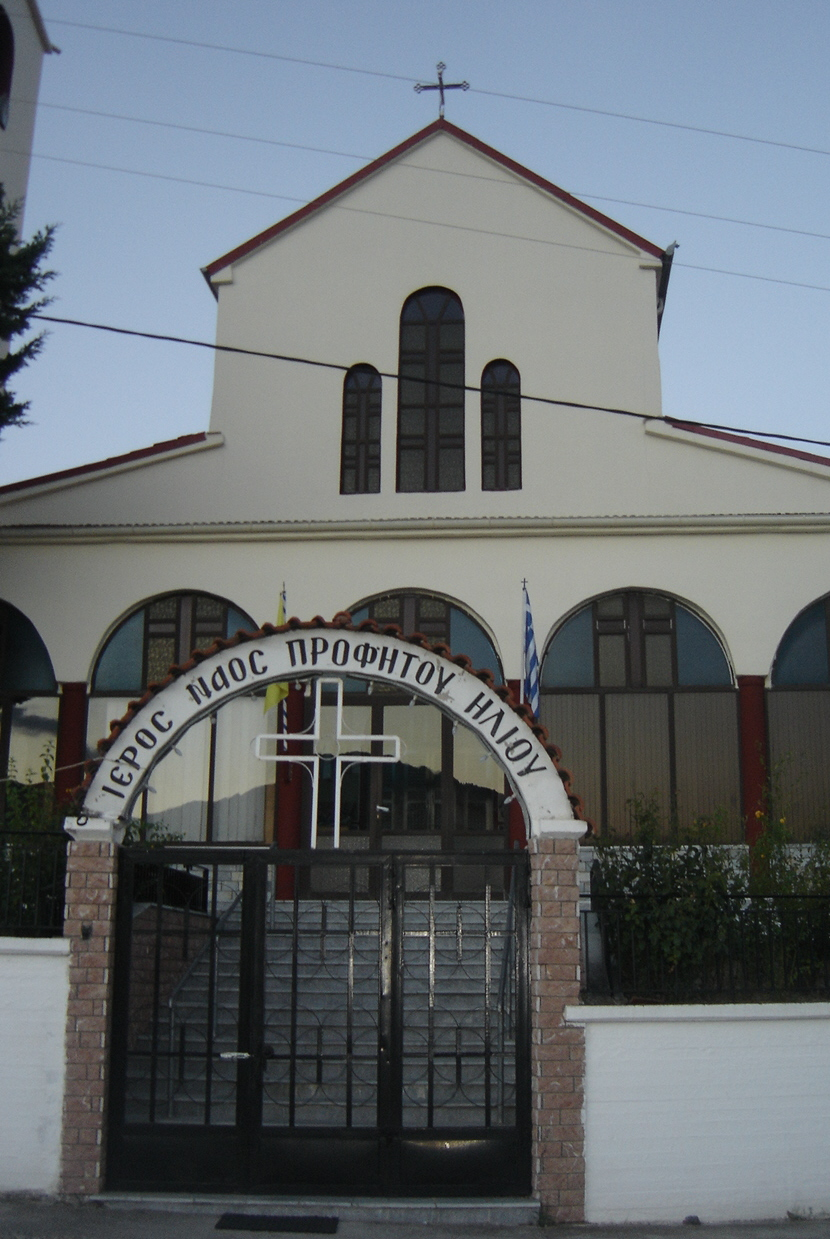
- Church of Prophet Elias

- Location within Greece
- Coordinates: 40°21′N 22°22′E
- Country: Greece
- Administrative region: Central Macedonia
- Regional unit: Pieria
- Municipality: Katerini
- Municipal unit: Elafina
- Elevation: 390 m (1,280 ft)

Population (2021)
  - Community: 324
- Time zone: UTC+2 (EET)
  - Summer (DST): UTC+3 (EEST)
- Postal code: 601 00
- Area code: 23510
- Vehicle registration: KN

Katalonia (Greek: Καταλώνια) is a village and a community of the Katerini municipality in Greece. Before the 2011 local government reform it was part of the municipality of Elafina, of which it was a municipal district. The 2021 census recorded 324 inhabitants in the village.

== Transport ==
Katalonia is on one of the northwestern ends of the Pieria Provincial Road 3 (the other being in Elafos), towards Katerini.
