= Elafina =

Elafina Ελαφίνα
- Municipal unit
- Location within the regional unit

- Location within Greece
- Coordinates: 40°19′N 22°28′E
- Country: Greece
- Administrative region: Central Macedonia
- Regional unit: Pieria
- Municipality: Katerini

Area
  - Municipal unit: 160.690 km^{2} (62.043 sq mi)

Population (2021)
  - Municipal unit: 3,553
  - Municipal unit density: 22.11/km^{2} (57.27/sq mi)
- Time zone: UTC+2 (EET)
  - Summer (DST): UTC+3 (EEST)
- Postal code: 601 50
- Vehicle registration: KN

Elafina (Greek: Ελαφίνα) is a former municipality in Pieria regional unit, Greece. Since the 2011 local government reform it is part of the municipality Katerini, of which it is a municipal unit. The municipal unit has an area of 160.690 km^{2}. The population of the municipal unit was 3,553 in 2021. The seat of the municipality was in Palaio Keramidi.

== Administrative division ==
The municipal unit of Elafina consists of the following communities (populations in 2021):

- Aronas, population 292
- Elafos, population 395
- Exochi, population 479 (incl. Toxo)
- Katalonia, population 324
- Lagorrachi, population 414 (incl. Meliadi)
- Moschopotamos, population 457
- Palaio Keramidi, population 795
- Trilofos, population 397
