= Toxo, Pieria =

Toxo Τόξο
- Settlement
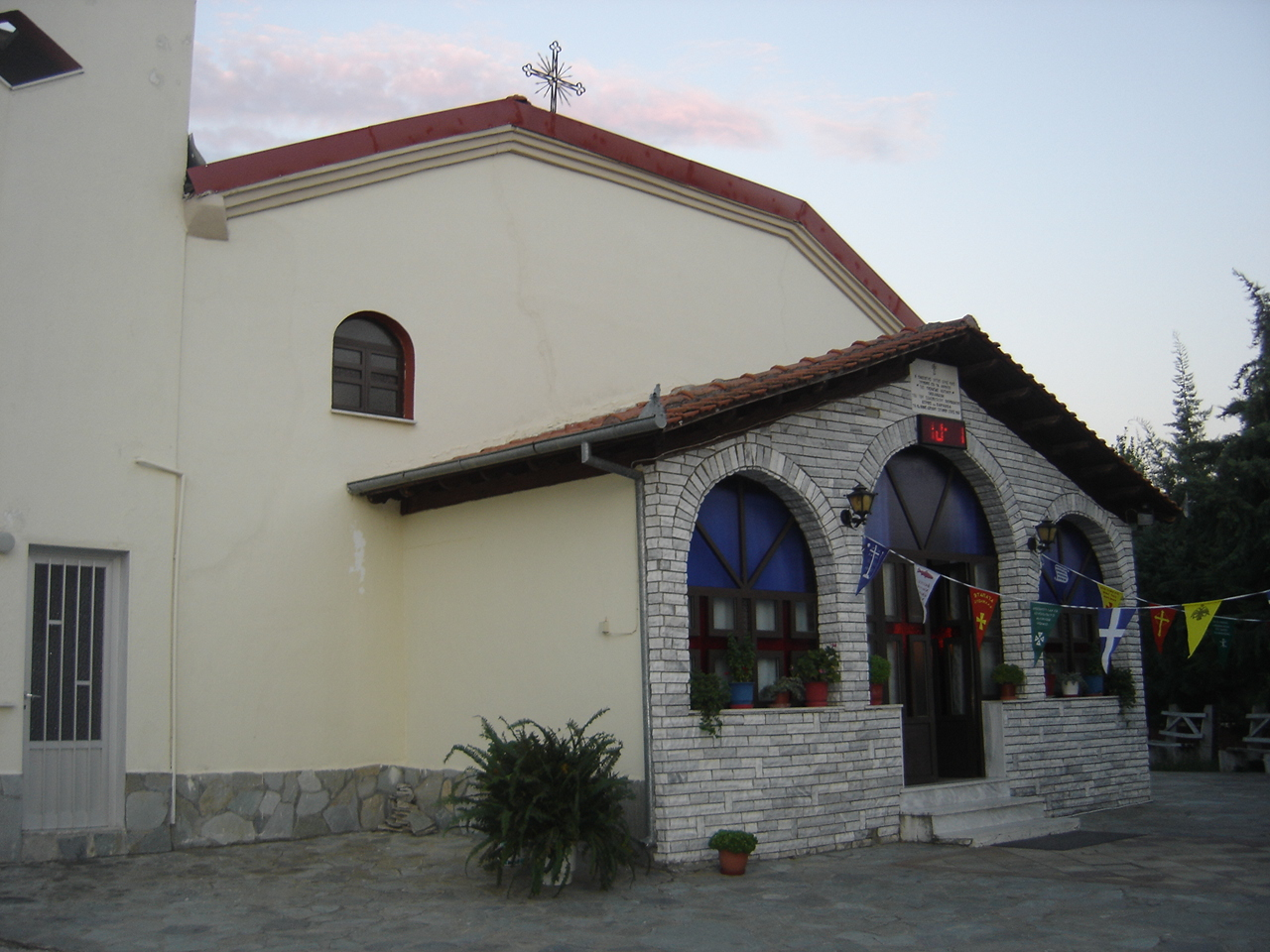
- The church of Toxo

- Location within Greece
- Coordinates: 40°20.424′N 22°23.762′E
- Country: Greece
- Administrative region: Central Macedonia
- Regional unit: Pieria
- Municipality: Katerini
- Municipal unit: Elafina
- Community: Exochi
- Elevation: 290 m (950 ft)

Population (2021)
  - Total: 101
- Time zone: UTC+2 (EET)
  - Summer (DST): UTC+3 (EEST)
- Postal code: 601 00
- Area code: +30-2351
- Vehicle registration: KN

Toxo (Greek: Τόξο, pronounced [ˈto̞kso̞]) is a village of the Katerini municipality. Before the 2011 local government reform it was part of the municipality of Elafina. The 2021 census recorded 101 inhabitants in the village. Toxo is a part of the community of Exochi.

== See also ==
- List of settlements in the Pieria regional unit
