= Sklithro, Larissa =

Sklithro Σκλήθρο
- Community
- Location within Greece
- Coordinates: 39°36′32″N 22°52′26″E
- Country: Greece
- Administrative region: Thessaly
- Regional unit: Larissa
- Municipality: Agia
- Municipal unit: Melivoia

Population (2021)
  - Community: 109
- Time zone: UTC+2 (EET)
  - Summer (DST): UTC+3 (EEST)

Sklithro is a village in Thessaly, Greece, not far from Larissa and Volos. It is part of the Melivoia municipal unit within the Agia municipality.
