= Lagorrachi =

Lagorrachi Λαγόρραχη
- Community
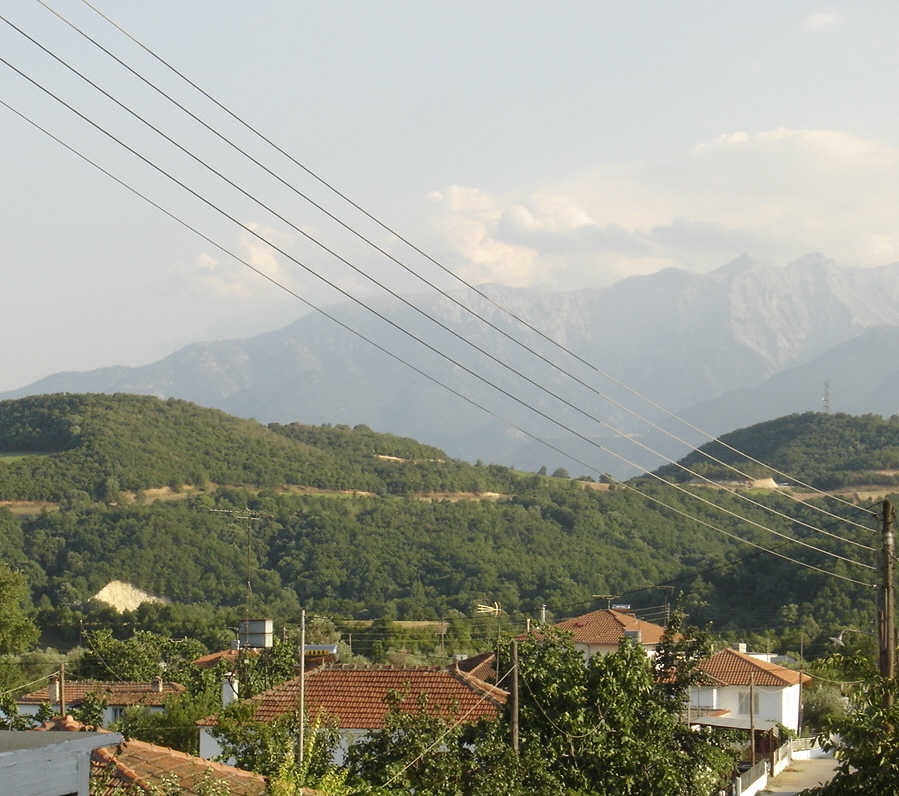
- A view of Lagorrachi with Mount Olympus in the background

- Location within Greece
- Coordinates: 40°17.5′N 22°21′E
- Country: Greece
- Administrative region: Central Macedonia
- Regional unit: Pieria
- Municipality: Katerini
- Municipal unit: Elafina

Area
  - Community: 20.317 km^{2} (7.844 sq mi)
- Elevation: 250 m (820 ft)

Population (2021)
  - Community: 414
  - Density: 20.4/km^{2} (52.8/sq mi)
- Time zone: UTC+2 (EET)
  - Summer (DST): UTC+3 (EEST)
- Postal code: 601 00
- Area code: +30-2351
- Vehicle registration: KN

Lagorrachi (Greek: Λαγόρραχη) is a village and a community of the Katerini municipality. Before the 2011 local government reform it was part of the municipality of Elafina, of which it was a municipal district. The 2021 census recorded 414 inhabitants in the community, which includes the village of Meliadi. The community of Lagorrachi covers an area of 20.317 km^{2}.

== See also ==
- List of settlements in the Pieria regional unit
