= Potamia, Agia =

Potamia Ποταμιά
- Community
- Location within Greece
- Coordinates: 39°39.7′N 22°47.2′E
- Country: Greece
- Administrative region: Thessaly
- Regional unit: Larissa
- Municipality: Agia
- Municipal unit: Agia

Area
  - Community: 32.899 km^{2} (12.702 sq mi)
- Elevation: 170 m (560 ft)

Population (2021)
  - Community: 248
  - Density: 7.54/km^{2} (19.5/sq mi)
- Time zone: UTC+2 (EET)
  - Summer (DST): UTC+3 (EEST)
- Postal code: 400 03
- Area code: +30-2494
- Vehicle registration: PI

Potamia (Greek: Ποταμιά, Greek pronunciation: [potam'ɲia]) is a village and a community of the Agia municipality. The community of Potamia covers an area of 32.899 km^{2}.

== Geography ==
The village is located 6 km southeast of Agia, at the northern slopes of Mavrovouni Mountain.

== Population ==
Historical population
Year	Pop.	±%
2001	297	—
2011	262	−11.8%
2021	248	−5.3%

== See also ==
- List of settlements in the Larissa regional unit
