= Elafos, Larissa =

Elafos Έλαφος
- Community
- Location within Greece
- Coordinates: 39°34.7′N 22°47′E
- Country: Greece
- Administrative region: Thessaly
- Regional unit: Larissa
- Municipality: Agia
- Municipal unit: Agia

Area
  - Community: 56.50 km^{2} (21.81 sq mi)
- Elevation: 480 m (1,570 ft)

Population (2021)
  - Community: 116
  - Density: 2.05/km^{2} (5.32/sq mi)
- Time zone: UTC+2 (EET)
  - Summer (DST): UTC+3 (EEST)
- Postal code: 400 03
- Area code: +30-2494
- Vehicle registration: PI

Elafos (Greek: Έλαφος, Greek pronunciation: ['elafos]) is a village and a community of the Agia municipality. The community of Elafos covers an area of 56.50 km^{2}.

== Population ==
Historical population
Year	Pop.	±%
2001	219	—
2011	219	+0.0%
2021	116	−47.0%

== See also ==
- List of settlements in the Larissa regional unit
