= Pyrgetos =

Community in Thessaly, Greece

Pyrgetos Πυργετός
- Community
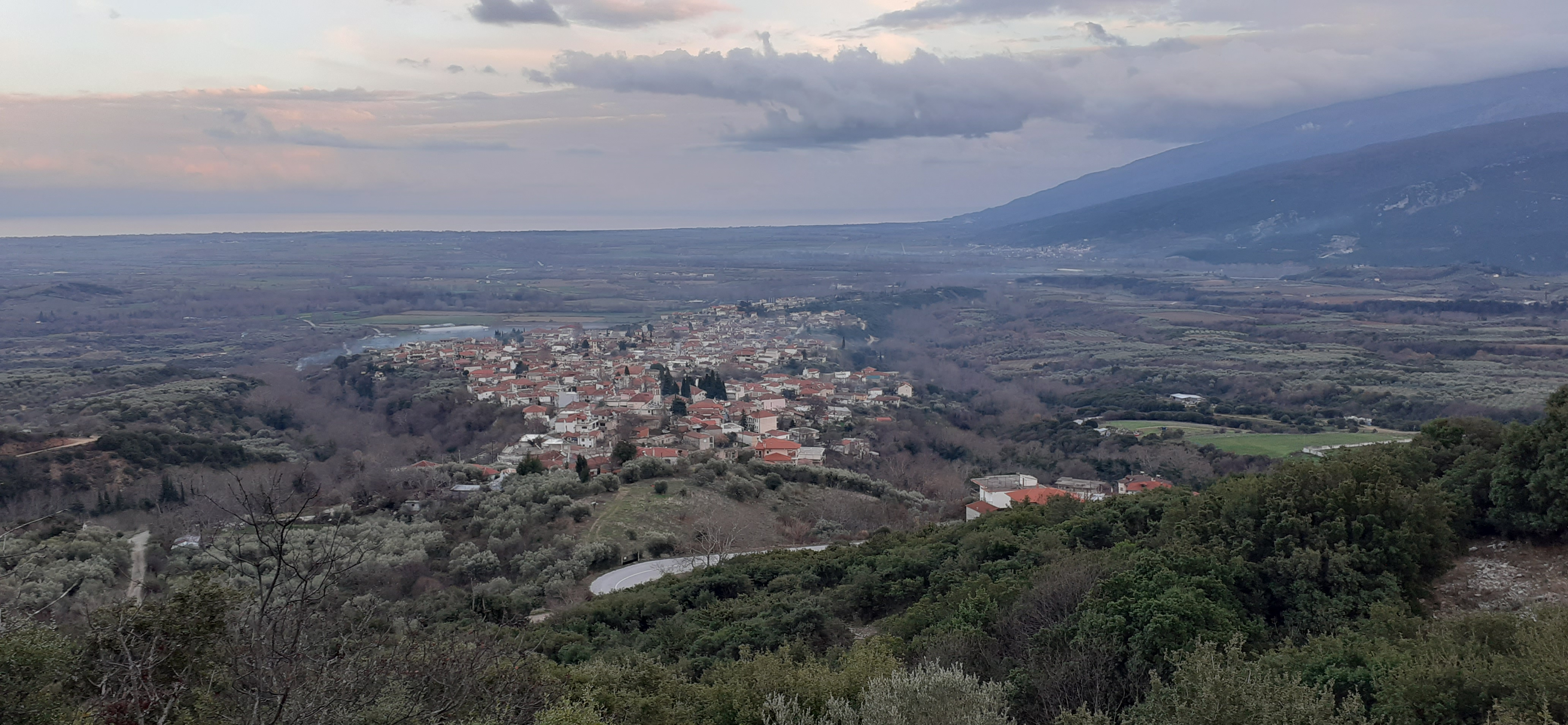

- Location within Greece
- Coordinates: 39°55′05″N 22°35′44″E
- Country: Greece
- Administrative region: Thessaly
- Regional unit: Larissa
- Municipality: Tempi
- Municipal unit: Kato Olympos

Population (2021)
  - Community: 1,373
- Time zone: UTC+2 (EET)
  - Summer (DST): UTC+3 (EEST)

Pyrgetos (Greek: Πυργετός) is a village in the Larissa regional unit, Thessaly, Greece. It was the seat of the former municipality of Kato Olympos, which has been part of the municipality of Tempi since 2011. Its elevation is 140 m. In 2021 its population was 1,373. It is located on the southeastern slopes of Mount Olympus, 4 km east of Rapsani, 34 km northeast of Larissa and 40 km south of Katerini. It is situated near the Delta of Pineios, which is a protected area, part of the Natura 2000 network. Remains of a Venetian bridge are situated at the place Leivadi.
