= Potamia, Xanthi =

Human settlement in Greece

Coordinates: 41.03°N 25.04°E

Potamia (Greek: Ποταμιά) is a settlement in the Xanthi regional unit of Greece. It is located two kilometers west of Nea Kessani and is also three kilometers southwest of Lake Vistonida. In 1991, the settlement contained 197 inhabitants.
