= Lyciscus of Athens =

5th-century Athenian demagogue

Lyciscus (Ancient Greek: Λυκίσκος) was an Athenian demagogue in the 5th century BCE.

He obliged Euryptolemus to drop his threatened prosecution of Callixenus for his illegal decree against the commanders who had conquered at Arginusae in 406 BCE, by moving that such as attempted to prevent the people from doing what they chose should have their fate decided by the same ballot as the generals themselves. It is possible that the comedy of Alexis, called "Lyciscus", had reference to this demagogue.
