= Elafos, Pieria =

Elafos Έλαφος
- Community
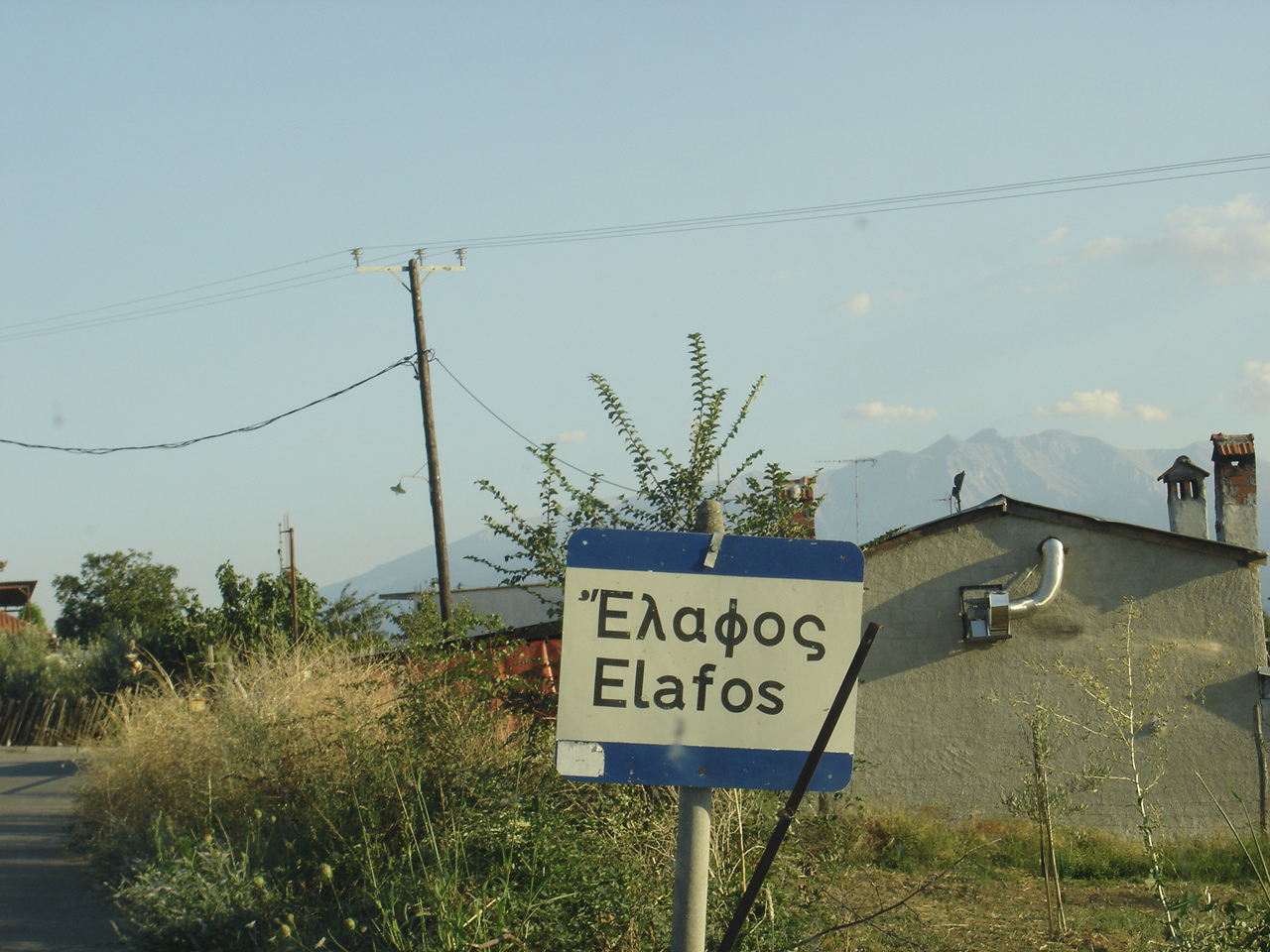
- Entrance to the village with Mount Olympus in the background

- Location within Greece
- Coordinates: 40°22.5′N 22°24′E
- Country: Greece
- Administrative region: Central Macedonia
- Regional unit: Pieria
- Municipality: Katerini
- Municipal unit: Elafina

Area
  - Community: 10.699 km^{2} (4.131 sq mi)
- Elevation: 345 m (1,132 ft)

Population (2021)
  - Community: 395
  - Density: 36.9/km^{2} (95.6/sq mi)
- Time zone: UTC+2 (EET)
  - Summer (DST): UTC+3 (EEST)
- Postal code: 601 00
- Area code: +30-2351
- Vehicle registration: KN

Elafos (Greek: Έλαφος) is a village and a community of the Katerini municipality. Before the 2011 local government reform it was part of the municipality of Elafina, of which it was a municipal district. The community of Elafos covers an area of 10.699 km^{2}.

== Population ==
Historical population
Year	Pop.	±%
2001	584	—
2011	499	−14.6%
2021	395	−20.8%

== Transport ==
Elafos is on one of the northwestern ends of the Pieria Provincial Road 3 (the other being in Katalonia), towards Katerini.

== See also ==
- List of settlements in the Pieria regional unit
