= Monastery of Komnenion =

Eastern Orthodox monastery in Greece

Coordinates: 39.8583°N 22.7400°E

The Monastery of Komnenion (Greek: Μονή Κομνηνείου) is an Eastern Orthodox monastery located near Stomio, Larissa, Greece.

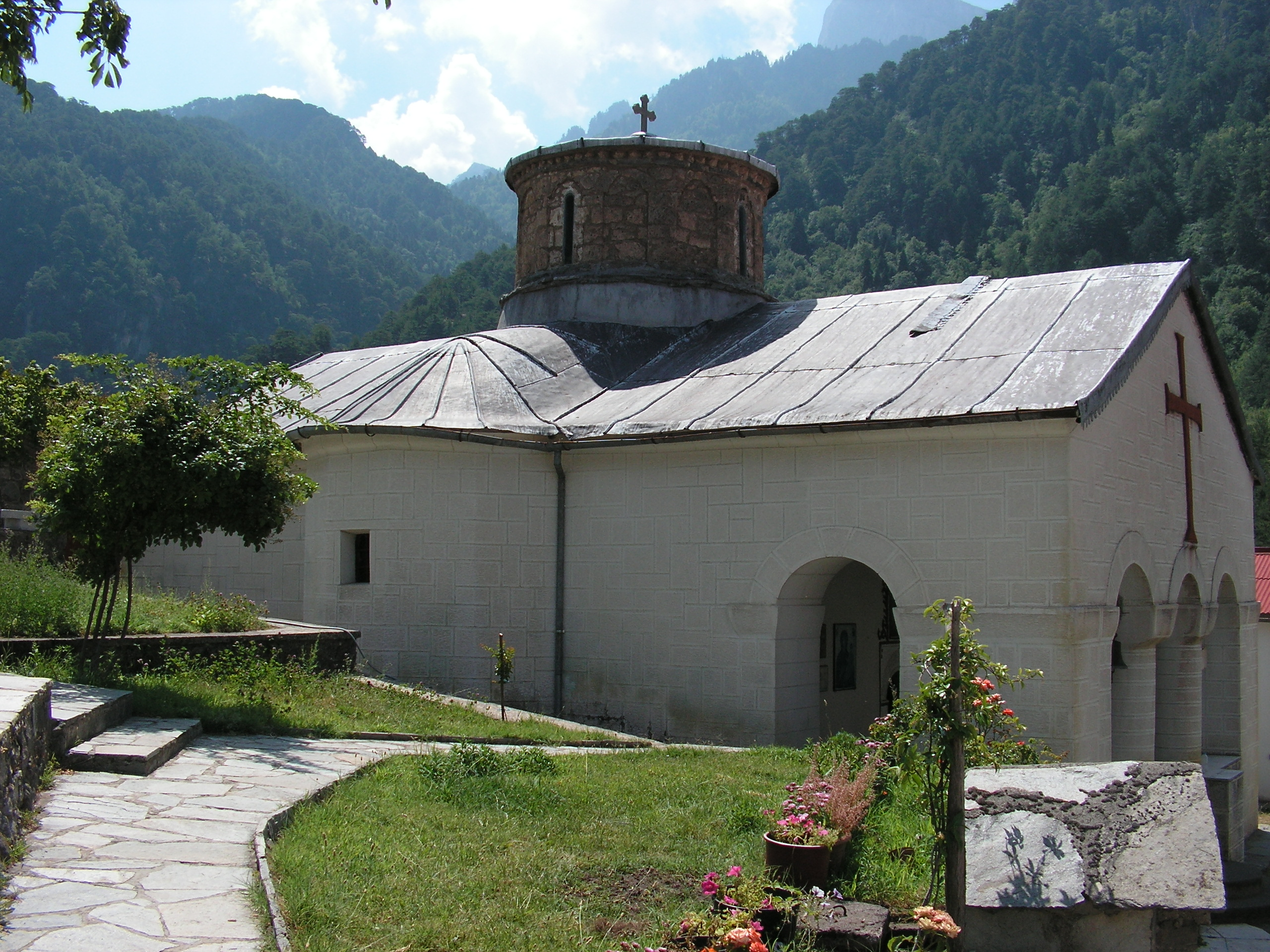
View

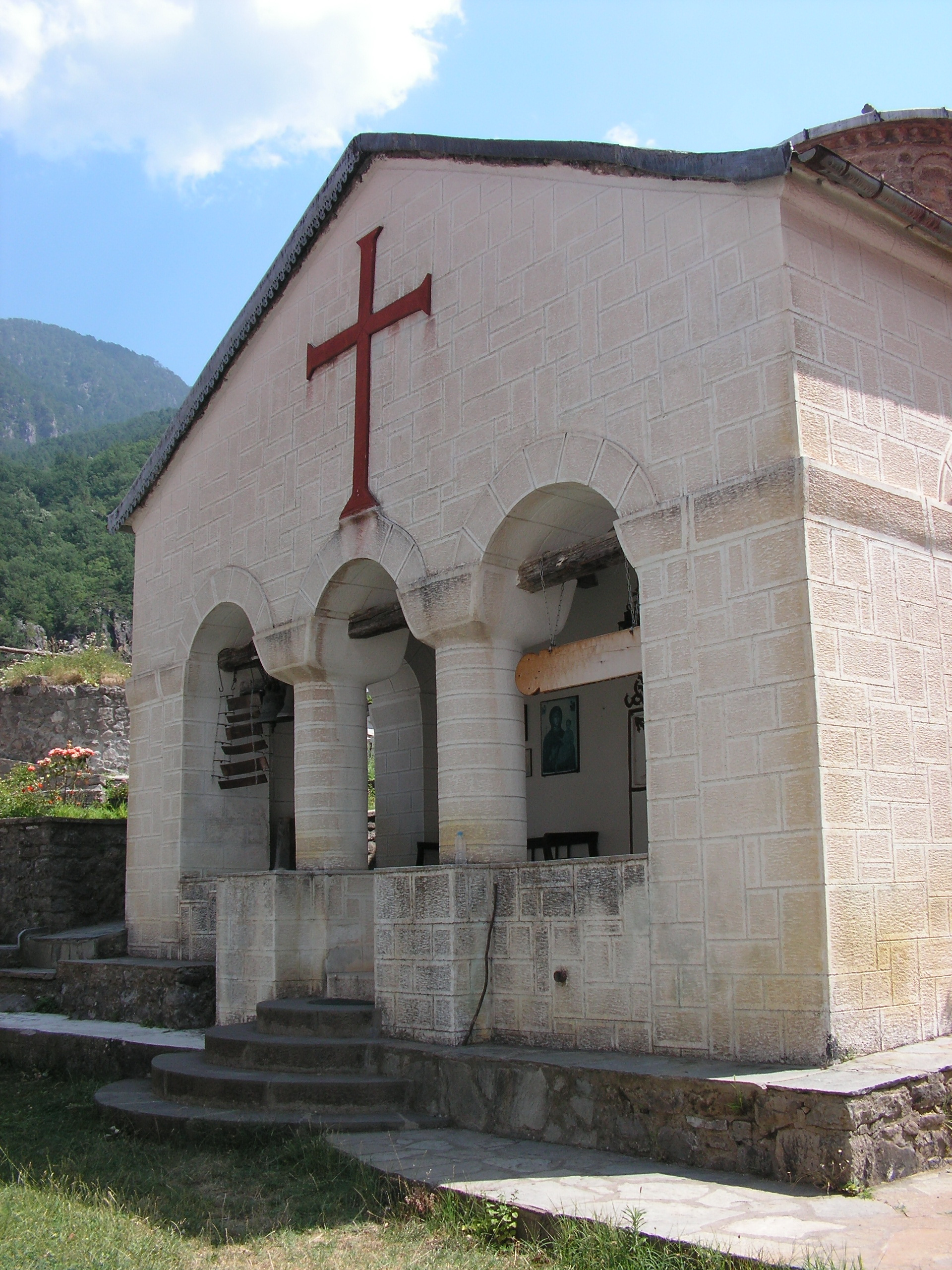
Front of the church

According to tradition it was founded in the time of Justinian I (r. 527–565), but was rebuilt in its present form by Byzantine emperor Alexios I Komnenos (r. 1081–1118).

The modern main church (katholikon) dates largely to the 16th century, with some parts from a 14th-century structure. The outer walls are decorated with large numbers of ancient and Byzantine spolia, but the surviving interior frescoes date to 1758. Modern archaeological excavations have discovered traces of the Komnenian-era katholikon underneath.

The monastery was destroyed by fire in 1868 and the katholikon was left ruined for over a century after; it was restored in the early 2000s by the 7th Ephorate of Byzantine Antiquities with European Union funds. The modern Monastery of the Dormition of the Theotokos and of Saint Demetrios has been erected around the old structure.
