= Lyciscus (general) =

Lyciscus (Ancient Greek: Λυκίσκος) was an officer of Agathocles of Syracuse, by whom he was much esteemed for his military talents.

During the expedition of Agathocles to Africa in 309 BCE, Lyciscus, being heated with wine at a banquet, assailed his master with abuse, which the latter met only with good-humored jesting. But Archagathus, the son of Agathocles, was greatly exasperated; and when Lyciscus, in answer to his threats after the banquet, threw in his teeth his suspected intrigue with his step-mother Alcia, he seized a spear and slew him. The consequence was a formidable mutiny in the army, which it required all the boldness and prudence of Agathocles to quell.
