= Agiokampos, Larissa =

Village in Greece

Coordinates: 39°24′52″N 22°31′27″E

Agiokampos (Greek: Αγιόκαμπος) is a village in the municipality of Agia (community Skiti), in the Larissa regional unit in Greece. It has 371 inhabitants (2021 census). It is a beach resort.

Agiokampos' beach along with Velika's and Sotiritsa's has a length of 10.5 km (~6.5 miles) and are the most popular beach in the regional unit of Larissa with masses of tourists coming every summer mainly from Hungary, Czech Republic and the entire Greece.
