= Eurymenae =

Town and polis (city-state) in Magnesia, ancient Thessaly

Coordinates: 39°50′10″N 22°47′31″E

Eurymenae or Eurymenai (Ancient Greek: Εὐρυμεναί or Εὐρυμέναι) or Erymnae or Erymnai (Ὲρυμναί) was a town and polis (city-state) in Magnesia, ancient Thessaly, situated upon the Aegean Sea coast at the foot of Mount Ossa, between Rhizus and Myrae. Pliny the Elder relates that crowns thrown into a fountain at Eurymenae became stones. It was destroyed by Lyciscus in the 4th century BCE.

The site has been located at a place called Kokkino Nero.
