= Agia, Larissa =

Agia Αγιά
- Municipality
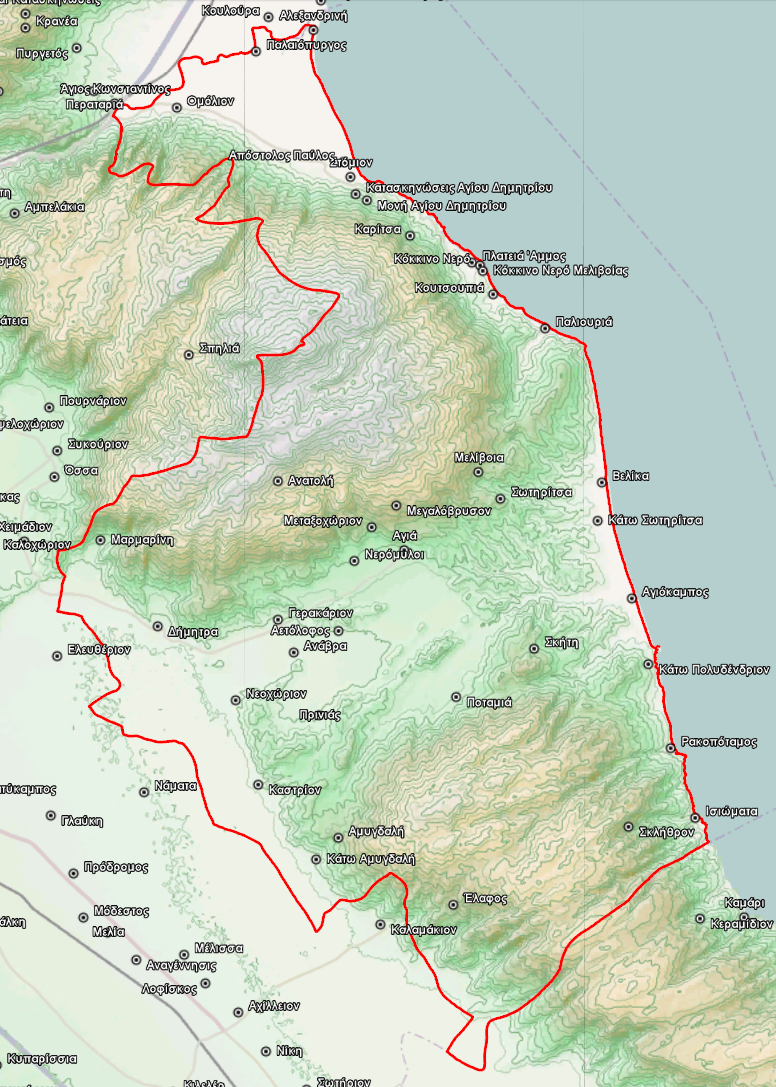

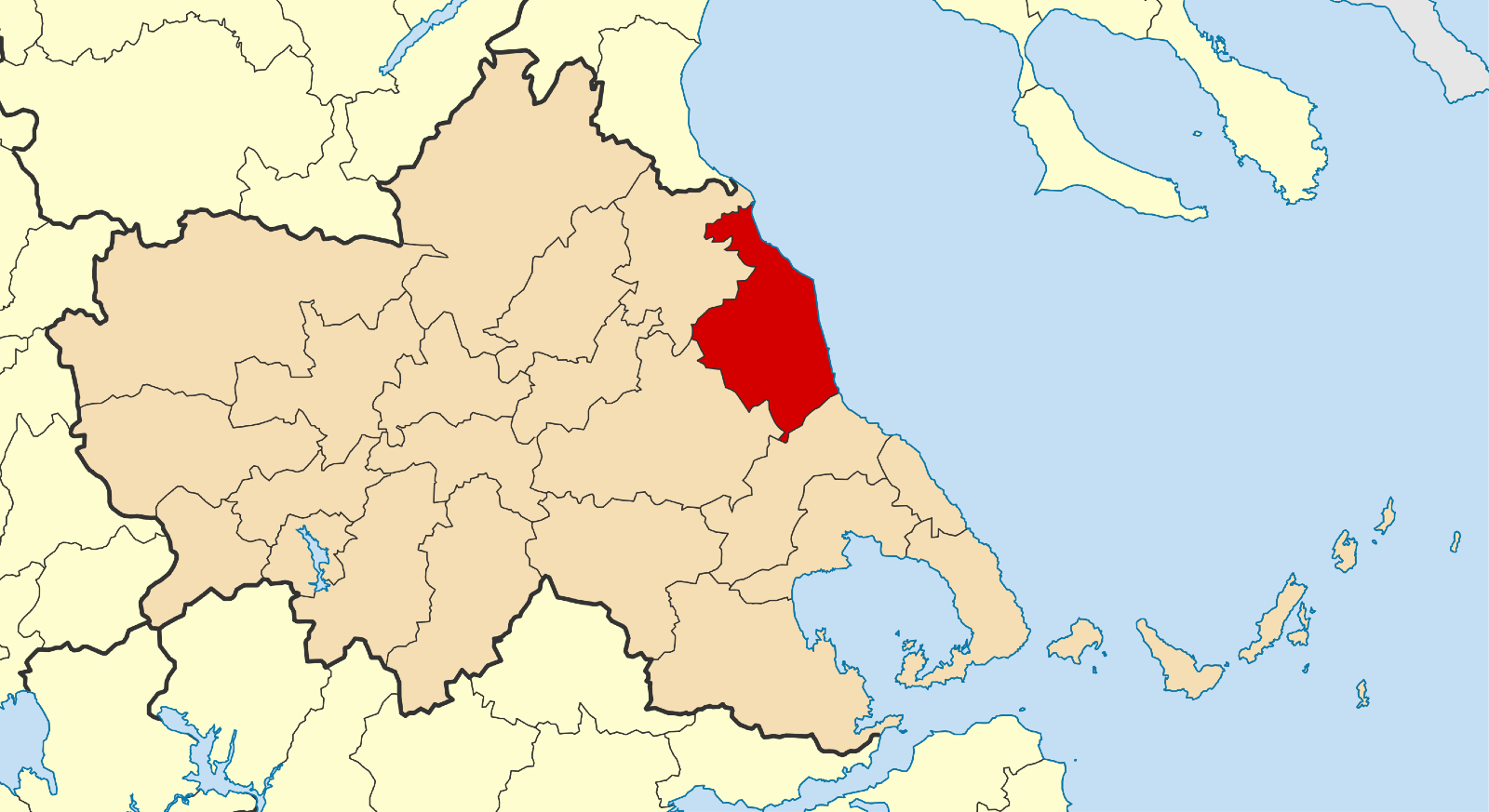

- Location within Greece
- Coordinates: 39°43′N 22°45′E
- Country: Greece
- Administrative region: Thessaly
- Regional unit: Larissa

Area
  - Municipality: 661.79 km^{2} (255.52 sq mi)
  - Municipal unit: 189.49 km^{2} (73.16 sq mi)
  - Community: 27.150 km^{2} (10.483 sq mi)
- Elevation: 135 m (443 ft)

Population (2021)
  - Municipality: 10,711
  - Density: 16.185/km^{2} (41.919/sq mi)
  - Municipal unit: 5,466
  - Municipal unit density: 28.85/km^{2} (74.71/sq mi)
  - Community: 3,013
  - Community density: 111.0/km^{2} (287.4/sq mi)
- Time zone: UTC+2 (EET)
  - Summer (DST): UTC+3 (EEST)
- Postal code: 400 03
- Vehicle registration: ΡΙ

Agia (Greek: Αγιά, romanized: Agiá) is a village and a municipality in the Larissa regional unit, Thessaly, Greece. Agia is located east of Larissa and south of Melivoia. The Mavrovouni mountains dominate the south and the Aegean Sea lies to the east.

== Municipality ==
The municipality Agia was formed at the 2011 local government reform by the merger of the following 4 former municipalities, that became municipal units:

- Agia
- Evrymenes
- Lakereia
- Melivoia

The municipality Agia has an area of 661.79 km^{2}, the municipal unit Agia has an area of 189.487 km^{2}, and the community Agia has an area of 27.150 km^{2}.

=== Subdivisions ===
The municipal unit of Agia is divided into the following communities:

- Agia
- Aetolofos
- Anavra
- Elafos
- Gerakari
- Megalovryso
- Metaxochori
- Neromyloi
- Potamia

== Province ==
The province of Agia (Greek: Επαρχία Αγιάς) was one of the provinces of the Larissa Prefecture. It had the same territory as the present municipality. It was abolished in 2006.

== Population ==
| Year | Town | Municipal unit | Municipality |
|---|---|---|---|
| 1981 | 3,454 | - | - |
| 1991 | 4,014 | 7,411 | - |
| 2001 | 3,027 | 6,458 | - |
| 2011 | 3,169 | 5,855 | 11,470 |
| 2021 | 3,013 | 5,466 | 10,711 |

== History ==
Agia became part of Greece, along with most of Thessaly, in 1881. Forests near Agia were affected by the 2007 Greek forest fires, leaving tens homeless. The fire consumed approximately 100 km^{2} on Mavrovouni.

== See also ==
- List of settlements in the Larissa regional unit
