= Mount Ossa (Greece) =

Mountain in Thessaly, Greece, famous for its mythic association with Mount Pelion

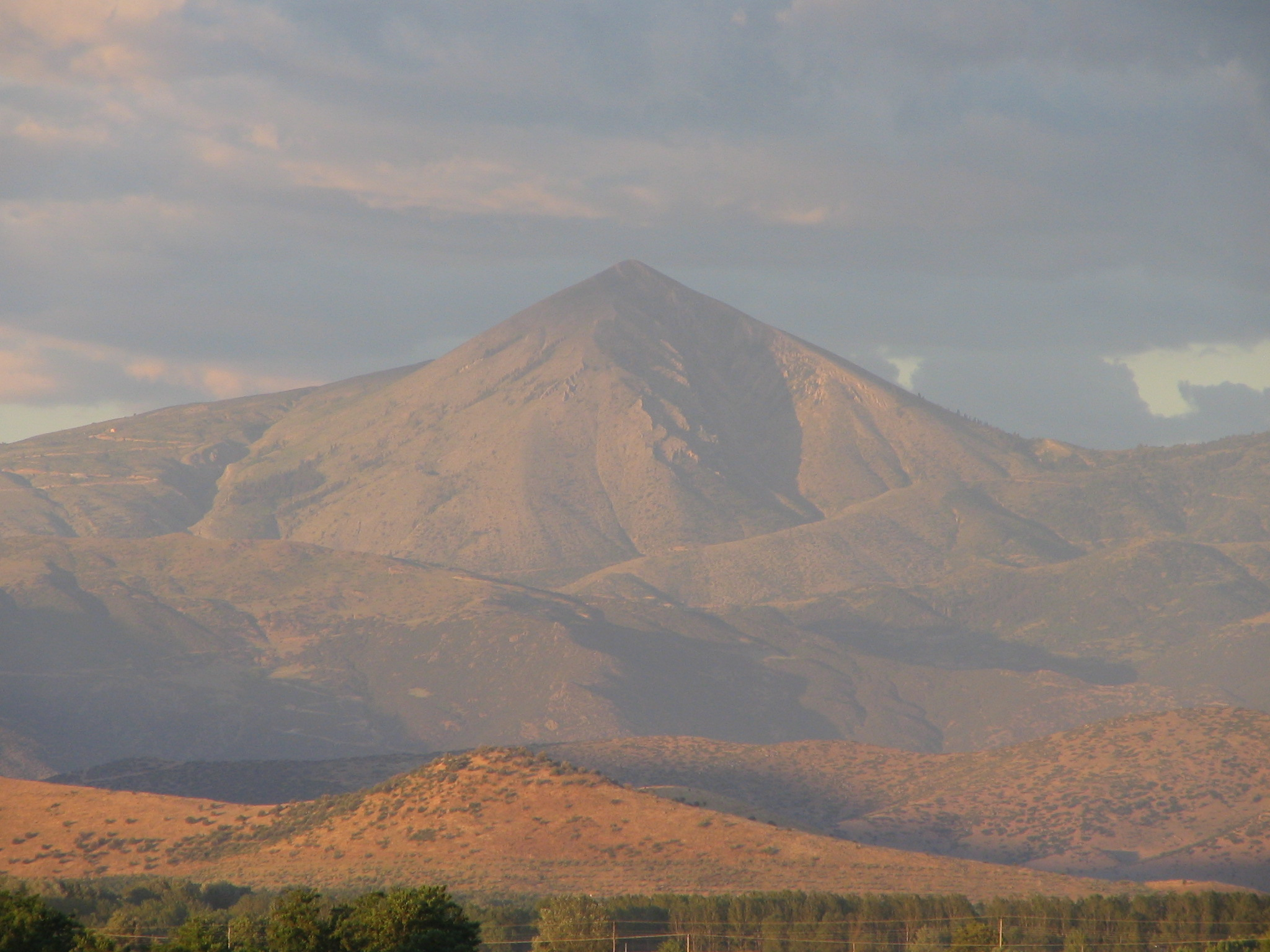

Highest point
- Elevation: 1,978 m (6,490 ft)
- Prominence: 1,854 m (6,083 ft)
- Listing: Ultra
- Coordinates: 39°47′49″N 22°41′13″E

Geography
- Location within Greece
- Location: Larissa regional unit, Greece

Mount Ossa (Greek: Όσσα), alternatively Kissavos (Κίσσαβος), is a mountain in the Larissa regional unit, in Thessaly, Greece. It is 1,978 metres (6,490 ft) high and is located between Pelion to the south and Olympus to the north, separated from the latter by the Vale of Tempe.

== Etymology ==
The name Kissavos is Serbian kiša meaning "wet weather, rain" and began being used in the 11th century.

Previously the Ancient Greek name Ossa was used, which was revived again in the 20th century.

== Mythology ==
In Greek mythology, the Aloadaes are said to have attempted to pile Mount Pelion on top of Mount Ossa in their attempt to scale Olympus.

== See also ==
- Ossa Cave
- List of European ultra prominent peaks
