= Kefalovryso =

Kefalovryso (Greek: Κεφαλόβρυσο, "headspring"), in Katharevousa Kefalovryson (Κεφαλόβρυσον), may refer to several places in Greece:

- Kefalovryso, Argolis, a village in Argolis, part of the municipal unit Lyrkeia
- Kefalovryso, Ioannina, a village in the Ioannina regional unit, part of the municipal unit Ano Pogoni
- Kefalovryso, Larissa, a village in the Larissa regional unit, part of the municipality Elassona
- Kefalovryso, Messenia, a village in Messenia, part of the municipal unit Aristomenis
- Kefalovryso, Trikala, a village in the Trikala regional unit, part of the municipal unit Faloreia
- Mega Kefalovryso, a village in the Trikala regional unit, part of the municipal unit Faloreia
- Thermo, Greece, formerly known as Kefalovryson until 1915.
