= Sarantaporos =

Sarantaporos (Greek: Σαραντάπορος) may refer to several rivers in Greece:

- Sarantaporos (Epirus), a tributary to the Vjosa in Epirus
- Sarantaporos (Thessaly), a tributary to the Titarisios in Thessaly

== See also ==
- Sarantaporo
- Battle of Sarantaporo
