= Christos Pagonis =

Greek resistance member, teacher politician

Christos Pagonis (Greek: Χρήστος Παγώνης; Lykoudi, 1901 – May 1997) was a Greek Resistance member, teacher and leftist politician. He was elected member of parliament for Larisa with EDA in 1958.

== Biography ==
He was born in Lykoudi, Elassona and was descended from a farming family. He got involved in syndicalism as member of the Teachers' Federation and resistance activity and politically with EDA and KKE. He was repeatedly arrested and tortured after 1945 and then imprisoned, as well as during the junta of 1967–1974. He was elected member of parliament in the 1958 elections with EDA. He died aged 96 in 1997 and was buried in Elassona on 11 May 1997.
