= Farmaki =

Farmaki Φαρμάκη
- Settlement
- Location within Greece
- Coordinates: 40°1.8′N 22°3.3′E
- Country: Greece
- Administrative region: Thessaly
- Regional unit: Larissa
- Municipality: Elassona
- Municipal unit: Sarantaporo
- Community: Tsapournia
- Elevation: 660 m (2,170 ft)

Population (2021)
  - Total: 134
- Time zone: UTC+2 (EET)
  - Summer (DST): UTC+3 (EEST)
- Postal code: 402 00
- Area code: +30-2493
- Vehicle registration: PI

Farmaki (Greek: Φαρμάκη, Greek pronunciation: [faɾ'maci]) is a village of the Elassona municipality. Before the 2011 local government reform it was a part of the municipality of Sarantaporo. Farmaki is a part of the community of Tsapournia.

== History ==
The settlement is recorded as village and as "Farmaki" in the Ottoman Maliyeden Müdevver Defter number 66 dating to 1470.

== Economy ==
The population of Farmaki is occupied in animal husbandry and agriculture.

== Population ==
Historical population
| Year | Pop. | ±% |
|---|---|---|
| 2001 | 213 | — |
| 2011 | 156 | −26.8% |
| 2021 | 134 | −14.1% |

== See also ==
- List of settlements in the Larissa regional unit
