= Tsapournia =

Tsapournia may refer to a number of places in Greece:

- Tsapournia, Achaea, a village in Erymanthos.
- Tsapournia, Euboea, a village in Istiaia-Aidipsos.
- Tsapournia, Larissa, a village and a community in Elassona.
