= Gerania =

Gerania may refer to:

- Gerania (beetle), a genus of beetles in the family Cerambycidae
- Gerania, Larissa, a village in Greece
- Geraneia, a range of mountains in Greece
- Gerania, cranes that could pour Greek fire onto enemy ships and were used by the Byzantine Empire
