= Kleisoura, Larissa =

Kleisoura Κλεισούρα
- Settlement
- Location within Greece
- Coordinates: 39°57.2′N 22°4.2′E
- Country: Greece
- Administrative region: Thessaly
- Regional unit: Larissa
- Municipality: Elassona
- Municipal unit: Elassona
- Community: Valanida
- Elevation: 500 m (1,600 ft)

Population (2021)
  - Total: 90
- Time zone: UTC+2 (EET)
  - Summer (DST): UTC+3 (EEST)
- Postal code: 402 00
- Area code: +30-2493
- Vehicle registration: PI

Kleisoura (Greek: Κλεισούρα, Greek pronunciation: [kli'suɾa]) is a village of the Elassona municipality. Before the 1997 local government reform it was part of the community of Valanida. The 2021 census recorded 90 inhabitants in the village.

== See also ==
- List of settlements in the Larissa regional unit
