= Ampelia =

Ampelia Αμπέλια
- Settlement
- Location within Greece
- Coordinates: 39°46′N 22°2.4′E
- Country: Greece
- Administrative region: Thessaly
- Regional unit: Larissa
- Municipality: Elassona
- Municipal unit: Verdikoussa
- Community: Verdikoussa
- Elevation: 250 m (820 ft)

Population (2021)
  - Total: 166
- Time zone: UTC+2 (EET)
  - Summer (DST): UTC+3 (EEST)
- Postal code: 402 00
- Area code: +30-2493
- Vehicle registration: PI

Ampelia (Greek: Αμπέλια, Greek pronunciation: [a'beʎa]) is a village of the Elassona municipality. Before the 2011 local government reform it was a part of the community of Verdikoussa.

== Population ==
Historical population
Year	Pop.	±%
2001	219	—
2011	256	+16.9%
2021	166	−35.2%

== See also ==
- List of settlements in the Larissa regional unit
