= Paliaskia =

Paliaskia Παλιάσκια
- Settlement
- Location within Greece
- Coordinates: 39°46.3′N 22°2′E
- Country: Greece
- Administrative region: Thessaly
- Regional unit: Larissa
- Municipality: Elassona
- Municipal unit: Verdikoussa
- Community: Verdikoussa
- Elevation: 280 m (920 ft)

Population (2021)
  - Total: 15
- Time zone: UTC+2 (EET)
  - Summer (DST): UTC+3 (EEST)
- Postal code: 400 05
- Area code: +30-2493
- Vehicle registration: PI

Paliaskia (Greek: Παλιάσκια, Greek pronunciation: [pa'ʎasca]) is a village of the Elassona municipality. Before the 2011 local government reform it was a part of the independent community of Verdikoussa. The 2021 census recorded 15 inhabitants in the village. Paliaskia is a part of the community of Verdikoussa.

== See also ==
- List of settlements in the Larissa regional unit
