= Evangelismos =

Evangelismos (Greek: Ευαγγελισμός) is a location name derived from the Annunciation of Virgin Mary (Evangelismos tes Theotokou in Greek) and may refer to:

- Evangelismos Hospital, a hospital in Athens
- Evangelismos metro station, a metro station in Athens

Also Evangelismos may refer to the following places in Greece:

- Evangelismos, Heraklion, part of the municipal unit of Kastelli, Heraklion regional unit
- Evangelismos, Larissa, part of the municipality of Tempi, Larissa regional unit
- Evangelismos, Elassona, part of the municipality of Elassona, Larissa regional unit
- Evangelismos, Messenia, part of the municipal unit of Methoni, Messenia regional unit
- Evangelismos, Thessaloniki, part of the municipal unit of Egnatia, Thessaloniki, regional unit
