= George Seremetis =

George Dimitriou Seremetis
- Born: 1879; Skamnia Elassonas, Ottoman Empire (now Greece)
- Died: 1950 (aged 70–71)
- Education: National and Kapodistrian University of Athens
- Occupation: Lawyer
- Spouse: Calliope Tatti
- Children: Two children

George Dimitriou Seremetis (Greek: Γεώργιος Σερεμέτης; 1879 - 1950) was a Greek lawyer and politician.

Seremetis was born in 1879 in Skamnia Elassonas, then ruled by the Ottoman Empire. Shortly after his birth, the city of Larissa was liberated and his family moved there. In 1897, George Seremetis started his studies at a law school of the University of Athens. He graduated in 1902. He was a lawyer in Larissa for ten years.

He moved to Thessaloniki in 1913 when the city was liberated from Ottoman rule. From 1914 to 1922, he participated in the administration of the Thessaloniki bar association and from 1922 to 1926 he served as general secretary of the bar association. In 1922, Seremetis married Calliope Tatti and raised two children.

From 1926 to 1945, he was elected president of the Thessaloniki bar association by a large majority. He later succeeded with the help of D. Vlachos to establish a "Lawyers' Fund of Welfare" (Greek: Tαμείο Προνοίας Νομικών) in Thessaloniki. He died in 1950 of a heart attack.

== Sources ==
- Armenopoulos, p. 47 of 1993

Preceded by Konstantinos Merkouriou	Mayor of Thessaloniki; 1943–1944	Succeeded by Dimitrios Kavvadas
