= Dolichi =

Dolichi Δολίχη
- Community
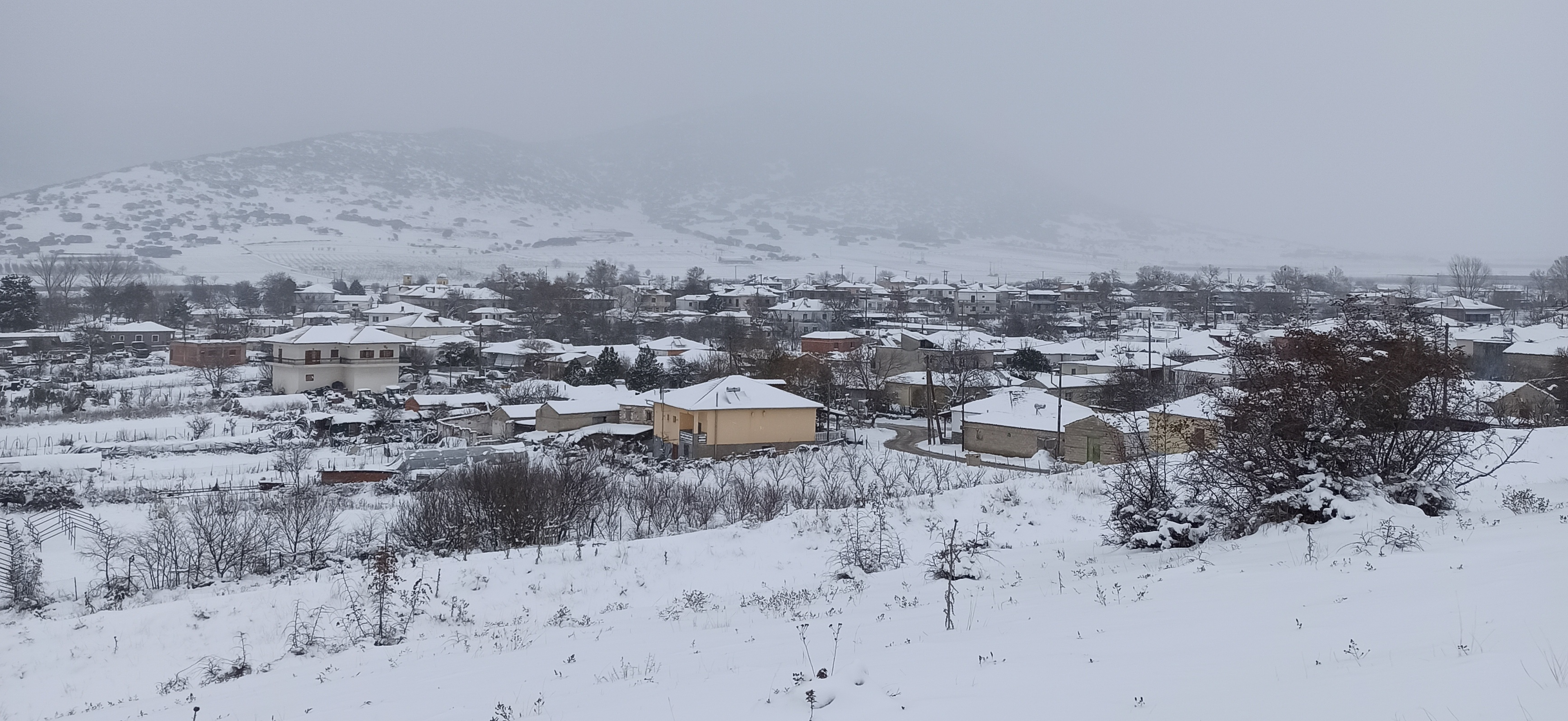
- Dolichi under snowfall

- Location within Greece
- Coordinates: 40°3.75′N 22°10.2′E
- Country: Greece
- Administrative region: Thessaly
- Regional unit: Larissa
- Municipality: Elassona
- Municipal unit: Livadi

Area
  - Community: 17.373 km^{2} (6.708 sq mi)
- Elevation: 590 m (1,940 ft)

Population (2021)
  - Community: 334
  - Density: 19.2/km^{2} (49.8/sq mi)
- Time zone: UTC+2 (EET)
  - Summer (DST): UTC+3 (EEST)
- Postal code: 402 00
- Area code: +30-2493
- Vehicle registration: ΡΙ

Dolichi (Greek: Δολίχη) is a village and a community of the Elassona municipality. Before the 2011 local government reform it was part of the municipality of Livadi, of which it was a municipal district. The 2021 census recorded 334 inhabitants in the village. The community of Dolichi covers an area of 17.373 km^{2}. Within the village's area is the site of the ancient city of Doliche.The settlement was formerly known as Douchlista (Δούχλιστα), and renamed to Dolichi (Δολίχη) in 1928.

Dolichi is situated on the west foot of Mount Olympus, 21 km from Elassona to Katerini, at an attitude of 5,90 m. Its inhabitants are mainly occupied with farming and agriculture (tobacco, grain, sugar beets, corn, clover etc.)

Attractions in the modern village include:

- The Church of the Holy Transfiguration of Christ, located in the central square. The present church dates to 1516 according to its dedicatory inscription, and was probably built on the remains of an earlier Byzantine era three-aisled basilica of the 13th century AD.
- The hill of Prophet Elias in antiquity was probably the ancient castle of Doliche Perrhaebiki Tripolis.
- The Folk Museum has been operating since 2007.
- The site at "fort", which according to the researchers placed the Kastri paliochristianiki Doliche. The castle is "station" on cultural and tourist development Doliche and the wider region.

== See also ==
- List of settlements in the Larissa regional unit
