= Lefki, Larissa =

Lefki Λεύκη
- Settlement
- Location within Greece
- Coordinates: 39°48.1′N 22°10.9′E
- Country: Greece
- Administrative region: Thessaly
- Regional unit: Larissa
- Municipality: Elassona
- Municipal unit: Elassona
- Community: Stefanovouno
- Elevation: 440 m (1,440 ft)

Population (2021)
  - Total: 6
- Time zone: UTC+2 (EET)
  - Summer (DST): UTC+3 (EEST)
- Postal code: 402 00
- Area code: +30-2493
- Vehicle registration: PI

Lefki (Greek: Λεύκη, Greek pronunciation: ['lefci]) is a village of the Elassona municipality. Before the 1997 local government reform it was part of the community of Stefanovouno. The 2021 census recorded 6 inhabitants in the village.

== See also ==
- List of settlements in the Larissa regional unit
