= Lazaros Kyrilidis =

Greek footballer (born 1963)

Personal information
- Date of birth: 9 April 1963 (age 63)
- Place of birth: Galanovrysi, Greece
- Height: 1.76 m (5 ft 9 in)
- Position: Midfielder

Senior career*
Years	Team	Apps	(Gls)
1981–1992	AEL		
1992–1994	Levadiakos		
- * Club domestic league appearances and goals

Lazaros Kyrilidis (Greek: Λάζαρος Κυριλλίδης; born 9 April 1963) is a retired Greek football midfielder.
