= Palaiokastro =

Palaiokastro or Paliokastro (Greek: Παλαιόκαστρο, pronounced [paleˈokastro], Παλιόκαστρο or Παληόκαστρο, meaning "old castle") may refer to the following places in Greece:

- Palaiokastritsa, a municipality in Corfu
- Palaiokastro, an old name for the town of Myrina, Lemnos island
- Palaiokastro, Andros, a village in the municipal unit Korthio, Andros island
- Palaiokastro, Arcadia, a village in Arcadia
- Palaiokastro, Chalkidiki, a village in the municipal unit Polygyros, Chalkidiki
- Palaiokastro, Heraklion, a village in Heraklion regional unit, Crete
- Palaiokastro, Ios, a medieval castle in the island of Ios
- Palaiokastro, Kozani, a village in the municipal unit Siatista, Kozani regional unit
- Palaiokastro, Larissa, a village in the municipal unit Elassona, Larissa regional unit
- Palaiokastro, Messenia, a village in the municipal unit Trikorfo, Messenia
- Palaiokastro, the Greek name of Old Pylos castle
- Palaiokastro, Phthiotis, a village in the municipal unit Agios Georgios Tymfristou, Phthiotis
- Palaiokastro (alternative name Mavri Rachi), ruins of medieval castle and archaeological site, Psara Island
- Palaiokastro, Samos, a village in the municipal unit Vathy, Samos island
- Palaiokastro, Serres, a village in the municipal unit Skotoussa, Serres
- Paliokastro, Trikala, a former municipality in Trikala regional unit

== See also ==
- Palekastro, a town in Lasithi, Crete
