= Koutsoufliani =

Koutsoufliani (Greek: Κουτσούφλιανη, Greek pronunciation: [ku't͡sufʎani]) may refer to a number of places in Greece:

- Koutsoufliani, Larissa, a village in Elassona
- Koutsoufliani, Phthiotis, a village in Makrakomi
- Koutsoufliani, Trikala, a village in Kalabaka
