= Giannota =

Giannota Γιαννωτά
- Community
- Location within Greece
- Coordinates: 39°58.7′N 22°2.7′E
- Country: Greece
- Administrative region: Thessaly
- Regional unit: Larissa
- Municipality: Elassona
- Municipal unit: Sarantaporo

Area
  - Community: 26.989 km^{2} (10.421 sq mi)
- Elevation: 550 m (1,800 ft)

Population (2021)
  - Community: 219
  - Density: 8.11/km^{2} (21.0/sq mi)
- Time zone: UTC+2 (EET)
  - Summer (DST): UTC+3 (EEST)
- Postal code: 402 00
- Area code: +30-2493
- Vehicle registration: PI

Giannota (Greek: Γιαννωτά, Greek pronunciation: [ʝano'ta]) is a village and a community of the Elassona municipality. Before the 2011 local government reform it was a part of the municipality of Sarantaporo, of which it was a municipal district. The community of Giannota covers an area of 26.989 km^{2}.

== History ==
The settlement is recorded as village and as "Yanota" in the Ottoman Tahrir Defter number 101 dating to 1521.

== Economy ==
The population of Giannota is occupied in animal husbandry and agriculture.

== Population ==
Historical population
Year	Pop.	±%
2001	449	—
2011	261	−41.9%
2021	219	−16.1%

== See also ==
- List of settlements in the Larissa regional unit
