= Kryovrysi, Larissa =

Kryovrysi Κρυόβρυση
- Community
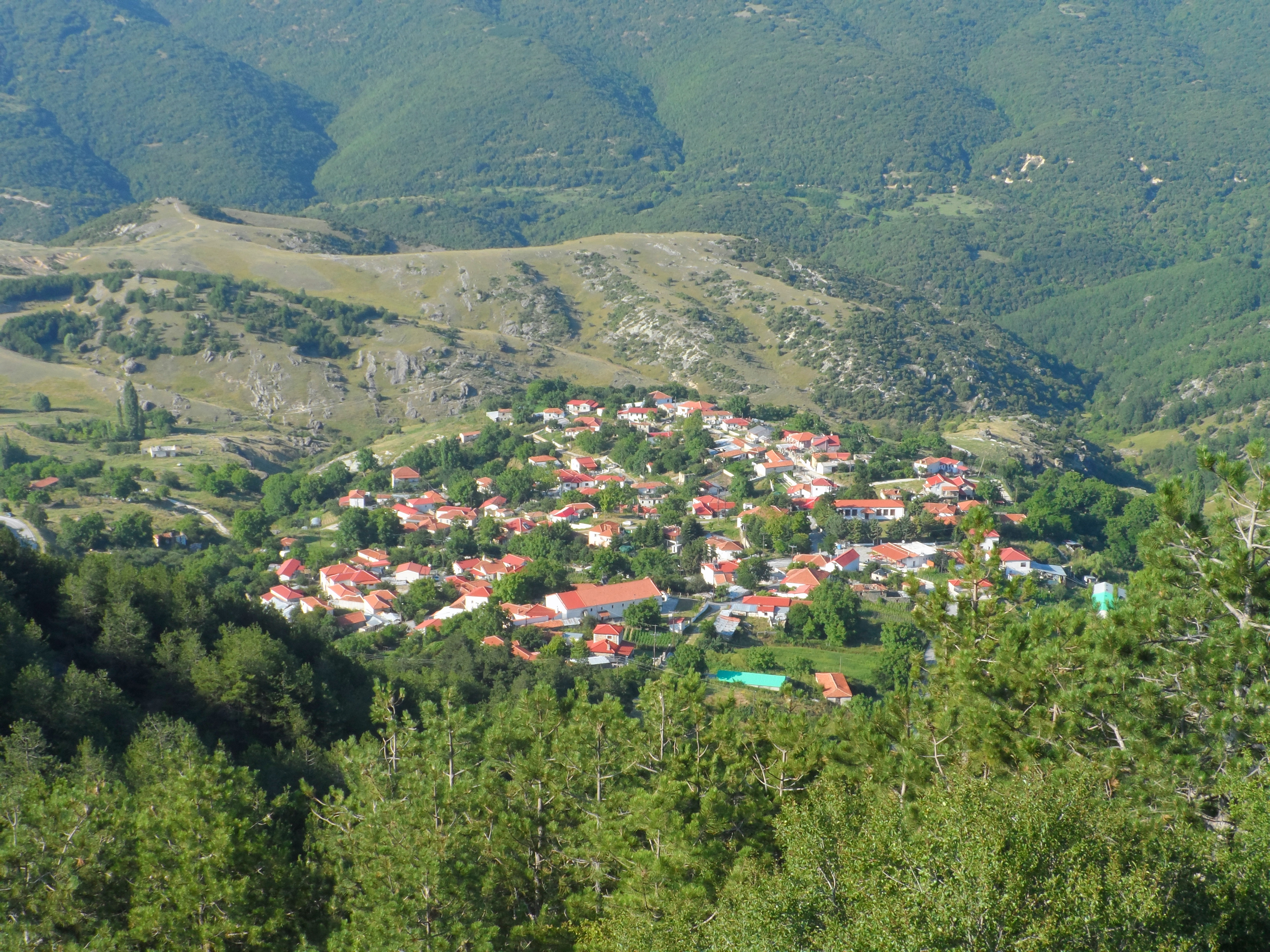

- Location within Greece
- Coordinates: 39°58.8′N 22°19.8′E
- Country: Greece
- Administrative region: Thessaly
- Regional unit: Larissa
- Municipality: Elassona
- Municipal unit: Karya

Area
  - Community: 36.467 km^{2} (14.080 sq mi)
- Elevation: 1,040 m (3,410 ft)

Population (2021)
  - Community: 70
  - Density: 1.9/km^{2} (5.0/sq mi)
- Time zone: UTC+2 (EET)
  - Summer (DST): UTC+3 (EEST)
- Postal code: 402 00
- Area code: +30-2493
- Vehicle registration: PI

Kryovrysi (Greek: Κρυόβρυση, Greek pronunciation: [kɾi'ovɾisi]) is a village and a community of the Elassona municipality. Before the 2011 local government reform it was a part of the community of Karya of which it was a communal district. The community of Kryovrysi covers an area of 36.467 km^{2}.

== Population ==
Historical population
Year	Pop.	±%
2001	72	—
2011	83	+15.3%
2021	70	−15.7%

== See also ==
- List of settlements in the Larissa regional unit
