= Paliampela, Larissa =

Paliampela Παλιάμπελα
- Settlement
- Location within Greece
- Coordinates: 39°45.2′N 22°0.5′E
- Country: Greece
- Administrative region: Thessaly
- Regional unit: Larissa
- Municipality: Elassona
- Municipal unit: Verdikoussa
- Community: Verdikoussa
- Elevation: 360 m (1,180 ft)

Population (2021)
  - Total: 70
- Time zone: UTC+2 (EET)
  - Summer (DST): UTC+3 (EEST)
- Postal code: 400 05
- Area code: +30-2493
- Vehicle registration: PI

Paliampela (Greek: Παλιάμπελα, Greek pronunciation: [pa'ʎabela]) is a village of the Elassona municipality. Before the 2011 local government reform it was a part of the independent community of Verdikoussa. Paliampela is a part of the community of Verdikoussa.

== Population ==
Historical population
Year	Pop.	±%
2001	90	—
2011	80	−11.1%
2021	70	−12.5%

== See also ==
- List of settlements in the Larissa regional unit
