= Sykaminea, Larissa =

Sykaminea Συκαμινέα
- Community
- Location within Greece
- Coordinates: 39°57.7′N 22°21.2′E
- Country: Greece
- Administrative region: Thessaly
- Regional unit: Larissa
- Municipality: Elassona
- Municipal unit: Karya

Area
  - Community: 47.254 km^{2} (18.245 sq mi)
- Elevation: 920 m (3,020 ft)

Population (2021)
  - Community: 106
  - Density: 2.24/km^{2} (5.81/sq mi)
- Time zone: UTC+2 (EET)
  - Summer (DST): UTC+3 (EEST)
- Postal code: 402 00
- Area code: +30-2493
- Vehicle registration: PI

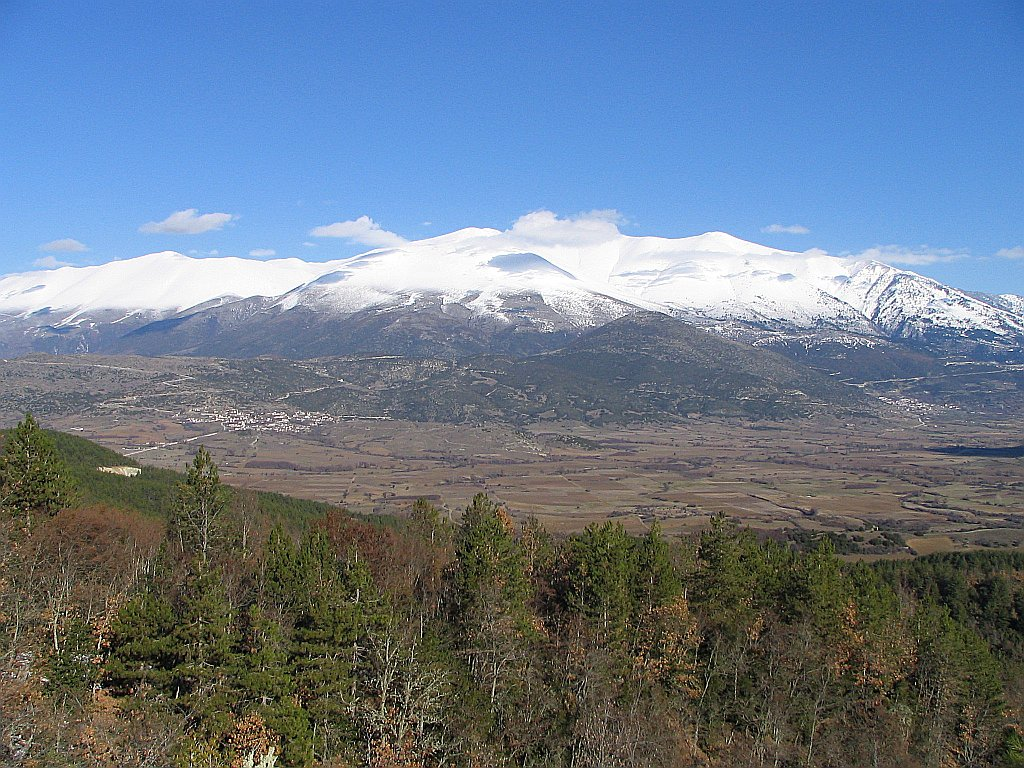
Sykaminea

Sykaminea (Greek: Συκαμινέα, Greek pronunciation: [sikami'nea]) is a village and a community of the Elassona municipality. Before the 2011 local government reform it was a part of the community of Karya of which it was a communal district. The community of Sykaminea covers an area of 47.254 km^{2}.

== Population ==
Historical population
Year	Pop.	±%
2001	143	—
2011	94	−34.3%
2021	106	+12.8%

== See also ==
- List of settlements in the Larissa regional unit
