= Sarantaporos (Thessaly) =

- Native name: Σαραντάπορος (Greek)

Location
- Country: Greece

Physical characteristics
- Source
  - location: Kamvounia mountains
- Mouth
  - location: Titarisios near Milea
  - coordinates: 40.0360°N 22.1113°E
- Length: approximately 20 km (12 mi)

Basin features
- Progression: Titarisios→ Pineios→ Aegean Sea

The Sarantaporos (Greek: Σαραντάπορος) is a river in the southeastern part of the Kozani regional unit and the northern part of the Larissa regional unit, in northern Greece. Its source is in the eastern part of the Kamvounia mountains, southeast of the town of Servia. The river passes east of the village Sarantaporo and flows into the Titarisios near the village Milea. Part of the Greek National Road 3 (Larissa - Kozani - Florina - Niki) runs through the Sarantaporos valley.

It is believed that it was this pass about which Alexander I of Macedon sent to warn the Greek force that was attempting to block the Persian advance through the Tempe Valley. Although longer and more difficult, the Sarantaporos Pass would enable the Persians to outflank and bypass the Greeks at Tempe.
