= Valanida =

Valanida Βαλανίδα
- Community
- Location within Greece
- Coordinates: 39°55.6′N 22°2.8′E
- Country: Greece
- Administrative region: Thessaly
- Regional unit: Larissa
- Municipality: Elassona
- Municipal unit: Elassona

Area
  - Community: 58.354 km^{2} (22.531 sq mi)
- Elevation: 357 m (1,171 ft)

Population (2021)
  - Community: 542
  - Density: 9.29/km^{2} (24.1/sq mi)
- Time zone: UTC+2 (EET)
  - Summer (DST): UTC+3 (EEST)
- Postal code: 402 00
- Area code: +30-2493
- Vehicle registration: PI

Valanida (Greek: Βαλανίδα, Greek pronunciation: [vala'niða]) is a village and a community of the Elassona municipality. Before the 2011 local government reform, it was part of the municipality of Elassona, of which it was a municipal district. The community of Valanida covers an area of 58.354 km^{2}.

== History ==
The settlement is recorded as a village and as "Valanida" in the Ottoman Tahrir Defter number 101 dating to 1521.

== Administrative division ==
The community of Valanida consists of two separate settlements:

- Kleisoura
- Valanida

== Population ==
Historical population
Year	Pop.	±%
2001	791	—
2011	559	−29.3%
2021	542	−3.0%

== See also ==
- List of settlements in the Larissa regional unit
