= Gerania, Larissa =

Gerania Γεράνια
- Community
- Location within Greece
- Coordinates: 40°0.7′N 22°8.1′E
- Country: Greece
- Administrative region: Thessaly
- Regional unit: Larissa
- Municipality: Elassona
- Municipal unit: Sarantaporo

Area
  - Community: 16.038 km^{2} (6.192 sq mi)
- Elevation: 460 m (1,510 ft)

Population (2021)
  - Community: 205
  - Density: 12.8/km^{2} (33.1/sq mi)
- Time zone: UTC+2 (EET)
  - Summer (DST): UTC+3 (EEST)
- Postal code: 402 00
- Area code: +30-2493
- Vehicle registration: PI

Gerania (Greek: Γεράνια, Greek pronunciation: [ʝe'ɾaɲa]) is a village and a community of the Elassona municipality. Before the 2011 local government reform it was a part of the municipality of Sarantaporo, of which it was a municipal district. The community of Gerania covers an area of 16.038 km^{2}.

== Economy ==
The population of Gerania is occupied in animal husbandry and agriculture.

== History ==
The village was named Delinista (Greek: Δελίνιστα, Greek pronunciation: [ðe'linista]) until 1927. In 1943 it was burned by the Axis occupation forces.

== Population ==
Historical population
| Year | Pop. | ±% |
|---|---|---|
| 1928 | 364 | — |
| 1940 | 464 | +27.5% |
| 1951 | 511 | +10.1% |
| 1961 | 622 | +21.7% |
| 1971 | 535 | −14.0% |
| 1981 | 439 | −17.9% |
| 1991 | 379 | −13.7% |
| 2001 | 360 | −5.0% |
| 2011 | 251 | −30.3% |
| 2021 | 205 | −18.3% |

== See also ==
- List of settlements in the Larissa regional unit
