= Karya, Larissa =

Karya Καρυά
- Municipal unit
- Location within the regional unit

- Location within Greece
- Coordinates: 39°59.1′N 22°23.5′E
- Country: Greece
- Administrative region: Thessaly
- Regional unit: Larissa
- Municipality: Elassona

Area
  - Municipal unit: 158.685 km^{2} (61.269 sq mi)
  - Community: 74.964 km^{2} (28.944 sq mi)
- Elevation: 900 m (3,000 ft)

Population (2021)
  - Municipal unit: 598
  - Municipal unit density: 3.77/km^{2} (9.76/sq mi)
  - Community: 422
  - Community density: 5.63/km^{2} (14.6/sq mi)
- Time zone: UTC+2 (EET)
  - Summer (DST): UTC+3 (EEST)
- Postal code: 402 00
- Area code: +30-2493
- Vehicle registration: PI

Karya (Greek: Καρυά, Greek pronunciation: [kaɾ'ʝa]) is a village, a community and a municipal unit of the Elassona municipality. Before the 2011 local government reform it was an independent community. The community of Karya covers an area of 74.964 km^{2} while the municipal unit covers 158.685 km^{2}.

== Administrative division ==
The municipal unit of Karya consists of three communities:

- Karya
- Kryovrysi
- Sykaminea

== Population ==
Historical population
Year	Pop.	±%
2001	874	—
2011	719	−17.7%
2021	598	−16.8%

== Geography and climate ==
It is close to Mount Olympus, encouraging tourists' visits. The area has moderate temperatures year round, though in winter snow falls over the upper elevations.

== Morias Cave ==
In the midst of World War II in 1941, a Nazi brigade stormed the village of Karya. A local hero, Aléxandros Yiannis Morias discovered a cave in Mount Olympus to hide the town from the Nazi invaders. The villagers were unharmed thanks to the discovery of the cave. In honor of the heroics of Aléxandros, the cave has since been named Morias Cave.

== See also ==
- List of settlements in the Larissa regional unit
