= Livadi =

Livadi Λιβάδι
- Municipal unit
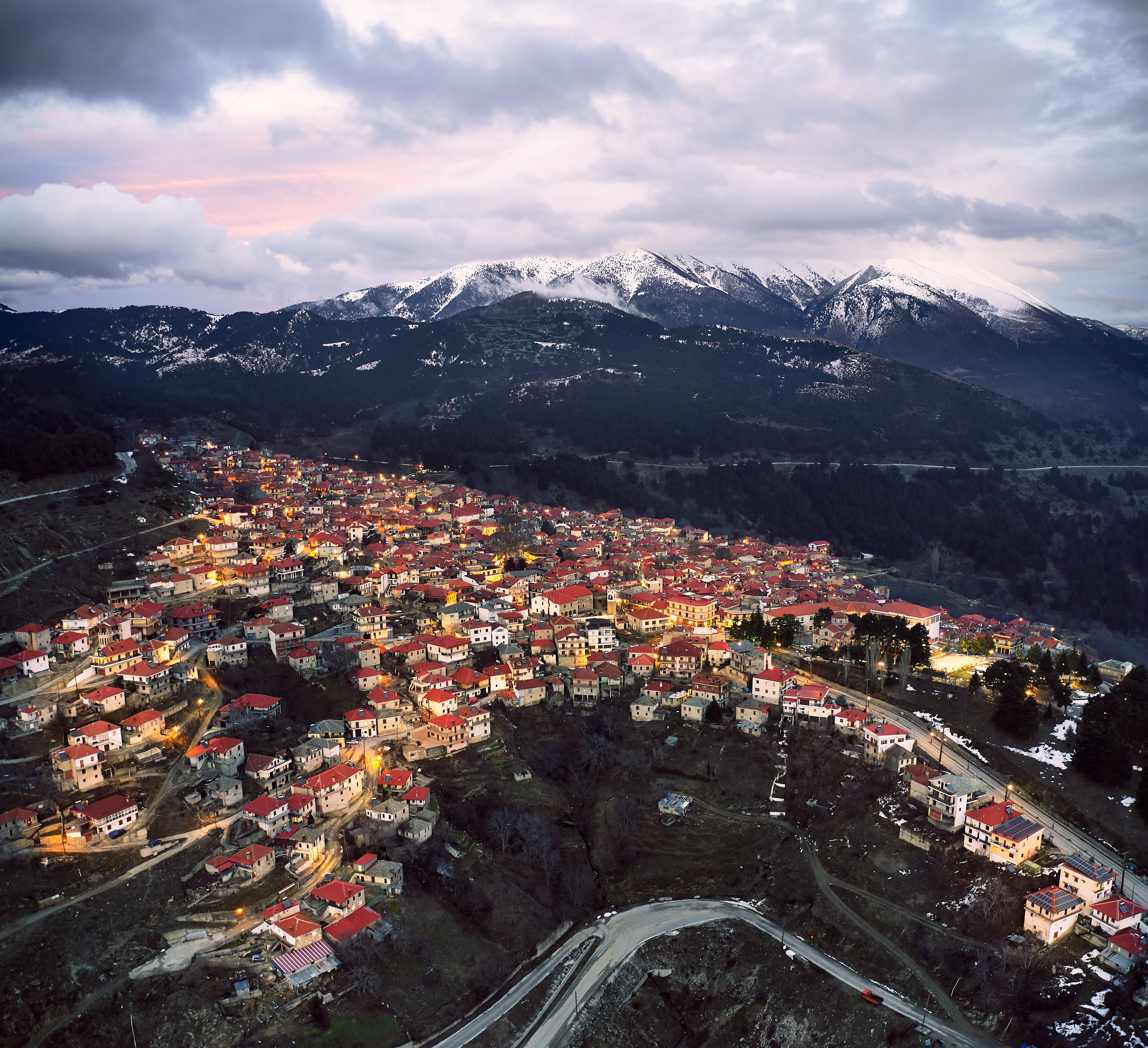

- Location within the regional unit

- Location within Greece
- Coordinates: 40°7.6′N 22°9.45′E
- Country: Greece
- Administrative region: Thessaly
- Regional unit: Larissa
- Municipality: Elassona

Area
  - Municipal unit: 158.273 km^{2} (61.110 sq mi)
  - Community: 140.90 km^{2} (54.40 sq mi)
- Elevation: 1,160 m (3,810 ft)

Population (2021)
  - Municipal unit: 2,413
  - Municipal unit density: 15.25/km^{2} (39.49/sq mi)
  - Community: 2,079
  - Community density: 14.76/km^{2} (38.22/sq mi)
- Time zone: UTC+2 (EET)
  - Summer (DST): UTC+3 (EEST)
- Postal code: 400 02
- Area code: +30-2493
- Vehicle registration: ΡΙ
- Website: www.livadi.gr

Livadi or Leivadi (Greek: Λ[ε]ιβάδι) is a village and a former municipality in the Larissa regional unit, Thessaly, Greece. Since the 2011 local government reform it is part of the municipality Elassona, of which it is a municipal unit.

In the Ottoman tahrir defteri of 1521, the settlement is recorded as a village with the name Livadi. The village was founded by Aromanian agricultural and livestock farmers. Before the 2011 local government reform it was an independent municipality. The community of Livadi covers an area of 140.90 km^{2} while the respective municipal unit 158.273 km^{2}.

== Subdivisions ==
The municipal unit Livadi is subdivided into the following communities:

- Dolichi
- Livadi

== Geography ==
Livadi borders Pieria regional unit to the northeast, and Kozani regional unit to the northwest. Livadi is located west of Pythio and Katerini, NNW of Larissa, north of Elassona and southeast of Kozani.

== Population ==
Year	Village population	Municipal unit population
1991	3,164	-
1991	2,882	-
2001	2,515	2,983
2011	2,244	2,674
2021	2,079	2,413

== Notable people ==
- Giorgakis Olympios (1772–1821), fighter in the Greek War of Independence
- Chris Pappas (b. 1980), American Senator, whose ancestors migrated from Livadi to New Hampshire
