= Lykoudi =

Lykoudi Λυκούδι
- Community
- Location within Greece
- Coordinates: 39°58.1′N 22°6.9′E
- Country: Greece
- Administrative region: Thessaly
- Regional unit: Larissa
- Municipality: Elassona
- Municipal unit: Sarantaporo

Area
  - Community: 20.784 km^{2} (8.025 sq mi)
- Elevation: 410 m (1,350 ft)

Population (2021)
  - Community: 181
  - Density: 8.71/km^{2} (22.6/sq mi)
- Time zone: UTC+2 (EET)
  - Summer (DST): UTC+3 (EEST)
- Postal code: 402 00
- Area code: +30-2493
- Vehicle registration: PI

Lykoudi (Greek: Λυκούδι, Greek pronunciation: [li'kuði]) is a village and a community of the Elassona municipality. Before the 2011 local government reform it was a part of the municipality of Sarantaporo, of which it was a municipal district. The community of Lykoudi covers an area of 20.784 km^{2}.

== Economy ==
The population of Lykoudi is occupied in animal husbandry and agriculture.

== History ==
Lykoudi has a history over 500 years. The settlement is recorded as village and as "Likodi" as well as "Ravyani" in the Ottoman Tahrir Defter number 101 dating to 1521. Lykoudi was burned by German occupation forces in 1943.

== Population ==
Historical population
Year	Pop.	±%
2001	332	—
2011	298	−10.2%
2021	181	−39.3%

== See also ==
- List of settlements in the Larissa regional unit
