= Stefanovouno =

Stefanovouno Στεφανόβουνο
- Community
- Location within Greece
- Coordinates: 39°50.6′N 22°10.8′E
- Country: Greece
- Administrative region: Thessaly
- Regional unit: Larissa
- Municipality: Elassona
- Municipal unit: Elassona

Area
  - Community: 37.79 km^{2} (14.59 sq mi)
- Elevation: 286 m (938 ft)

Population (2021)
  - Community: 417
  - Density: 11.0/km^{2} (28.6/sq mi)
- Time zone: UTC+2 (EET)
  - Summer (DST): UTC+3 (EEST)
- Postal code: 402 00
- Area code: +30-2493
- Vehicle registration: PI

Stefanovouno (Greek: Στεφανόβουνο, Greek pronunciation: [stefa'novuno]) is a village and a community of the Elassona municipality. Before 1927 the village was known as Aradosivia Zeinel Mahale(Greek: Αραδοσίβια Ζεϊνέλ). Until the exchange of populations in 1924 and the arrival of the refugees from Pontus, the village was inhabited by local Greeks and local Muslims. Before the 2011 local government reform it was part of the municipality of Elassona, of which it was a municipal district. The community of Stefanovouno covers an area of 37.79 km^{2}.

== Administrative division ==
The community of Stefanovouno consists of two separate settlements:

- Lefki
- Stefanovouno

== Population ==
Historical population
Year	Pop.	±%
2001	620	—
2011	495	−20.2%
2021	417	−15.8%

== See also ==
- List of settlements in the Larissa regional unit
