= Drymos, Larissa =

Drymos Δρυμός
- Community
- Location within Greece
- Coordinates: 39°54′56″N 22°08′49″E
- Country: Greece
- Administrative region: Thessaly
- Regional unit: Larissa
- Municipality: Elassona
- Municipal unit: Elassona

Area
  - Community: 20.259 km^{2} (7.822 sq mi)
- Elevation: 470 m (1,540 ft)

Population (2021)
  - Community: 439
  - Density: 21.7/km^{2} (56.1/sq mi)
- Time zone: UTC+2 (EET)
  - Summer (DST): UTC+3 (EEST)
- Postal code: 402 00
- Area code: +30-2493
- Vehicle registration: PI

Drymos (Greek: Δρυμός, Greek pronunciation: [ðɾi'mos]), known before 1958 as Drianovo (Greek: Δριάνοβο), is a village and a community of the Elassona municipality. Before the 2011 local government reform it was part of the municipality of Elassona, of which it was a municipal district. The community of Drymos covers an area of 20.259 km^{2}.

== Population ==
Historical population
Year	Pop.	±%
2001	683	—
2011	586	−14.2%
2021	439	−25.1%

== See also ==
- List of settlements in the Larissa regional unit
