= Milea, Larissa =

Milea Μηλέα
- Community
- Location within Greece
- Coordinates: 40°1.7′N 22°4.5′E
- Country: Greece
- Administrative region: Thessaly
- Regional unit: Larissa
- Municipality: Elassona
- Municipal unit: Sarantaporo

Area
  - Community: 12.628 km^{2} (4.876 sq mi)
- Elevation: 590 m (1,940 ft)

Population (2021)
  - Community: 313
  - Density: 24.8/km^{2} (64.2/sq mi)
- Time zone: UTC+2 (EET)
  - Summer (DST): UTC+3 (EEST)
- Postal code: 402 00
- Area code: +30-2493
- Vehicle registration: PI

Milea (Greek: Μηλέα, Greek pronunciation: [mi'lea]), known as Vourmpa (Greek: Βούρμπα) until 1957, is a village and a community of the Elassona municipality. Before the 2011 local government reform it was a part of the municipality of Sarantaporo, of which it was a municipal district. The community of Milea covers an area of 12.628 km^{2}.

== Economy ==
The population of Milea is occupied in winery and agriculture.

== Population ==
Historical population
Year	Pop.	±%
2001	460	—
2011	397	−13.7%
2021	313	−21.2%

== See also ==
- List of settlements in the Larissa regional unit
