= Calliope Tatti =

Calliope Tatti (Greek: Καλλιόπη Τάττη; born 1894, Thessaloniki, Ottoman Empire; died September 1978) was a Greek nurse and philanthropist from Thessaloniki. She volunteered as a nurse during the Balkan Wars and was later active in women's charitable associations in Thessaloniki.

== Early life and education ==
Tatti was born in Thessaloniki, then part of the Ottoman Empire, in 1894. She studied at the English School of Thessaloniki during the final period of Ottoman rule in the city. She was reported to have spoken English, French, Turkish, and Greek.

== Nursing and public service ==
After the capture of Thessaloniki by the Hellenic Army under Crown Prince Constantine during the First Balkan War in 1912, Tatti volunteered as a nurse at a hospital organized by the Central City School. The hospital treated wounded soldiers during the Balkan Wars.

Tatti later took part in a number of charitable associations in Thessaloniki. She served as vice-president and later chairman of the Phoenix charitable association from 1933 to 1941, and of the Philoptochos Fraternity of Thessaloniki Ladies from 1940 to 1950. During the German occupation of Greece, she used her personal resources to support residents of the city during the starvation period (1941–1944).

== Family ==
Tatti was the great-granddaughter of Constantine Tattis, who was said to have been a member of the Filiki Eteria, which organized the Greek War of Independence against the Ottoman Empire in the early 19th century. She was first married to Evangelos Sarris, an officer of the Cretan gendarmerie. After his death in 1917, she married George Seremetis in 1922. Seremetis was a lawyer in Thessaloniki and later served as mayor of the city.

She had three sons. Her eldest son, Constantine Sarris, was from her first marriage. From her second marriage she had Dimitrios Seremetis and Michael Seremetis. Constantine Sarris and Dimitrios Seremetis became lawyers in Thessaloniki, while Michael Seremetis became a thoracic surgeon and later worked in the United States.

== Death ==
She died in September 1978.
