= Elassona Mosque =

Former mosque in Elassona, Thessaly, Greece

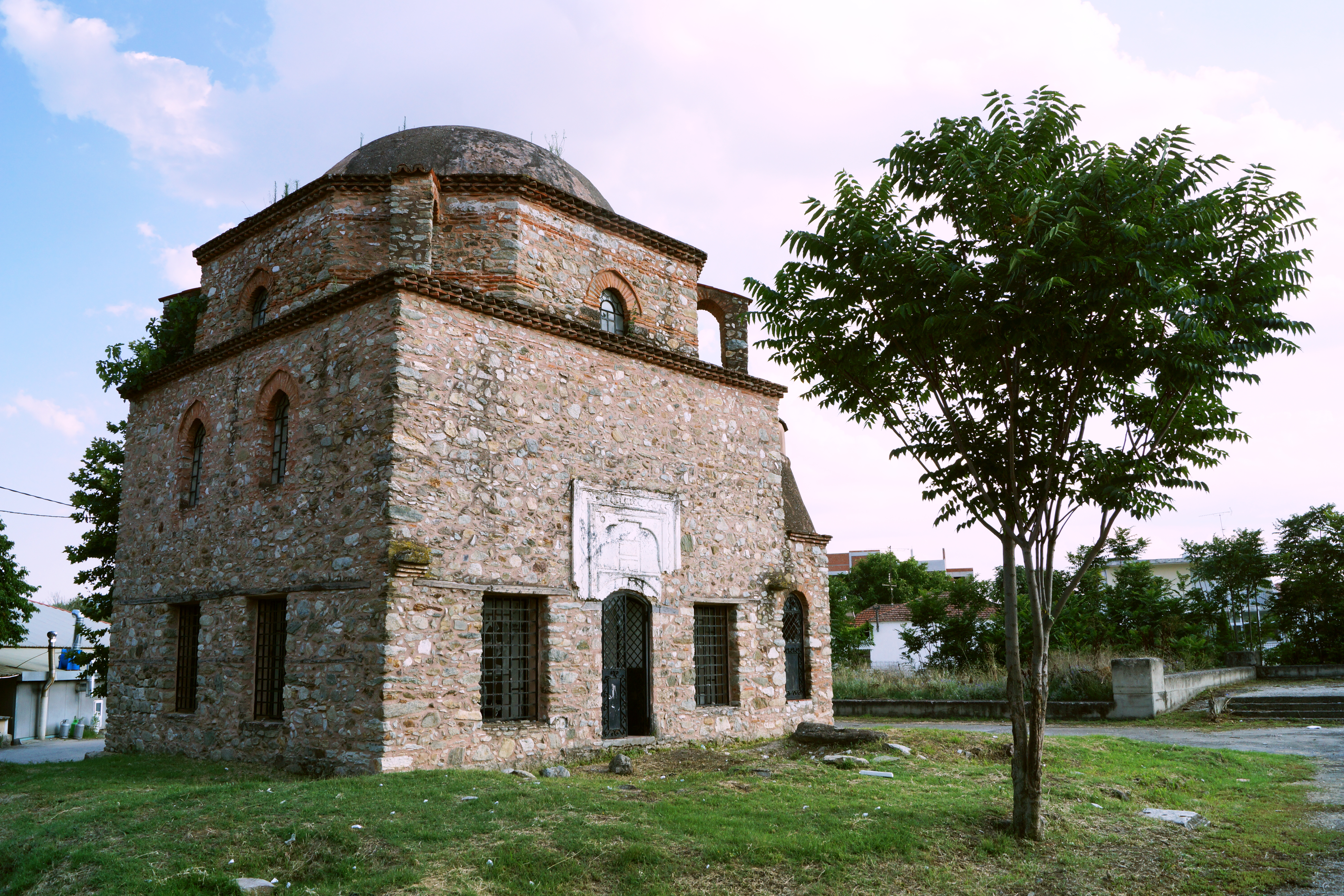
- The former mosque in 2018

- Location of the former mosque in Greece

Religion
- Affiliation: Islam (former)
- Ecclesiastical or organizational status: Mosque
- Status: Abandoned

Location
- Location: Elassona, Thessaly
- Country: Greece
- Interactive map of Elassona Mosque
- Coordinates: 39°53′39″N 22°11′9″E

Architecture
- Type: Mosque
- Style: Ottoman
- Completed: 17th or 18th century

Specifications
- Dome: 1
- Minaret: 1 (since collapsed)

The Elassona Mosque (Greek: Τζαμί Ελασσόνας), also known as the Muharrem Pasha Mosque, is a former mosque located in Elassona, in the Thessaly region of Greece. The former mosque was completed in the 17th or 18th century during the Ottoman era.

== Architecture ==
A simple and austere structure, the mosque comprises a single, square prayer hall. It is covered by a dome resting on an octagonal dome supported by pendentives. The walls are of rough masonry with irregular brick bands. The prayer hall is illuminated by 16 windows, arranged in two rows. The windows are framed by plaster frames on the interior. The mihrab is decorated with plain muqarnas. A wooden gallery once existed above the entrance, and a wooden porch stood before the gateway. The founder's inscription above the entrance has been erased. A minaret stood on the northwestern corner, but collapsed in 1961.

Work has been carried out to improve structural stability, but the building is not open to the public. For some time, the building was used to store parts of the Elassona archaeological collection.

== See also ==
- Islam in Greece
- List of former mosques in Greece
- Ottoman Greece
