= Tsapournia, Larissa =

Tsapournia Τσαπουρνιά
- Community
- Location within Greece
- Coordinates: 40°2.6′N 22°1.8′E
- Country: Greece
- Administrative region: Thessaly
- Regional unit: Larissa
- Municipality: Elassona
- Municipal unit: Sarantaporo

Area
  - Community: 27.197 km^{2} (10.501 sq mi)
- Elevation: 786 m (2,579 ft)

Population (2021)
  - Community: 229
  - Density: 8.42/km^{2} (21.8/sq mi)
- Time zone: UTC+2 (EET)
  - Summer (DST): UTC+3 (EEST)
- Postal code: 402 00
- Area code: +30-2493
- Vehicle registration: PI

Tsapournia (Greek: Τσαπουρνιά, Greek pronunciation: [t͡sapuɾ'ɲa]) is a village and a community of the Elassona municipality. Before the 2011 local government reform it was a part of the municipality of Sarantaporo, of which it was a municipal district. The community of Tsapournia covers an area of 27.197 km^{2}.

== History ==
The settlement is recorded as village and as "Çapurna" and as "Mavrolithari" in the Ottoman Maliyeden Müdevver Defter number 66 dating to 1470.

== Administrative division ==
The community of Tsapournia consists of two settlements:

- Farmaki and
- Tsapournia.

== Economy ==
The population of Tsapournia is occupied in animal husbandry and agriculture.

== Population ==
Historical population
Year	Pop.	±%
2001	398	—
2011	335	−15.8%
2021	229	−31.6%

== See also ==
- List of settlements in the Larissa regional unit
