= Verdikoussa =

Verdikoussa Βερδικούσσα
- Municipal unit
- Location within the regional unit

- Location within Greece
- Coordinates: 39°46.9′N 21°58.7′E
- Country: Greece
- Administrative region: Thessaly
- Regional unit: Larissa
- Municipality: Elassona

Area
  - Municipal unit: 101.267 km^{2} (39.099 sq mi)
- Elevation: 731 m (2,398 ft)

Population (2021)
  - Municipal unit: 1,350
  - Municipal unit density: 13.3/km^{2} (34.5/sq mi)
- Time zone: UTC+2 (EET)
  - Summer (DST): UTC+3 (EEST)
- Postal code: 400 05
- Area code: +30-2493
- Vehicle registration: PI

Verdikoussa (Greek: Βερδικούσσα, Greek pronunciation: [veɾði'kusa]) is a village, a community and a municipal unit of the Elassona municipality. Before the 2011 local government it was an independent community. The community of Verdikoussa covers an area of 101.267 km^{2}.

== Administrative division ==
The community of Verdikoussa consists of six settlements:

- Ampelia
- Koutsoufliani
- Paliampela
- Paliaskia
- Varkos
- Verdikoussa

== Economy ==
The population of Verdikoussa is occupied in animal husbandry, agriculture (tobacco and organic vegetables) and lumbering.

== Population ==
Historical population
Year	Pop.	±%
2001	2,126	—
2011	2,254	+6.0%
2021	1,350	−40.1%

== See also ==
- List of settlements in the Larissa regional unit
