= Kefalovryso, Trikala =

Kefalovryso Κεφαλόβρυσο
- Community
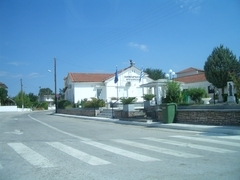
- View of the Faloreia Municipality Hall in Kefalovryso

- Location within Greece
- Coordinates: 39°34.8′N 21°41.6′E
- Country: Greece
- Administrative region: Thessaly
- Regional unit: Trikala
- Municipality: Trikala
- Municipal unit: Faloreia

Area
  - Community: 12.25 km^{2} (4.73 sq mi)
- Elevation: 125 m (410 ft)

Population (2021)
  - Community: 777
  - Density: 63.4/km^{2} (164/sq mi)
- Time zone: UTC+2 (EET)
  - Summer (DST): UTC+3 (EEST)
- Postal code: 42 100
- Area code: 24310

Kefalovryso (Greek:Κεφαλόβρυσο, Greek pronunciation: [cefaˈlovriso]) is a village in Trikala regional unit, Greece. In 2021 Kefalovryso had a population of 777. It is located 7 kilometers northwest of Trikala in the Thessalian Plain and close to the river Pineios.

== Population ==
Year	Ppl.
1889	555
1920	679
1928	796
1940	932
1951	1053
1961	1150
1971	928
1981	905
1991	907
2001	945
2011	952
2021	777

== Early history (1163-1881) ==
Kefalovryso's initial name was Mertzi or literally Mertzion (Greek: Μέρτζι/Μέρτζιον). The word Mertzi -by olders sometimes still in use as Mertsi- probably derives from the old Slavic word мрч, which means dark/black and might refer to the dark color of the soil. The first official reference to Mertzi is in an 1163 document of the Holy Bishopric of Stagai, and it is again found in several 14th-century monastic property deeds.

Mertzion, just like all Thessaly, was initially part of the Byzantine Empire. In 1204, after the Fourth Crusade, Thessaly was assigned to Boniface of Montferrat and in 1225 was conquered by Theodore Komnenos Doukas, ruler of Epirus. From 1271 to 1318 it was an independent despotate that extended to Acarnania and Aetolia, run by a branch of the Epirote Komnenos Doukas dynasty. In 1309 the Almogavars of the Catalan Company of the East (Societas Catalanorum Magna) settled there for a time. Later it was occupied by the Serbs until 1393, when it fell under Ottoman rule. In 1821 Thessaly participated in the Greek War of Independence. In 1823 during the Greek Revolution, one of the important battles took place near the village. On the 8th of August Markos Botsaris with 450 fighters from Souli attacked the Turkish forefront and killed many of them. But eventually they did not become part of independent Greece until 1881. Today there is a monument dedicated to Markos Botsaris in the village.

== Recent history (since 1881) ==
When Thessaly joined Greece in 1881, Mertzion, with 450 inhabitants, became part of the municipality of Trikala till 1912, when it became an autonomous community as Mertsi-Mikro Community. The newly formed community also included the settlements of Lesteno (now Dipotamos) and Rongia. In 1919 Lesteno and Rongia were extracted from the community of Mikro Mertsi and formed the community of Lesteno. In 1924 the Mikro Mertsi community was renamed into Kefalovryso Community. The modern name of the village is Kefalovryso (derived from kefali=head, main and vrysi=spring, fountain).

== Myth ==
According to the unwritten tradition, the modern name comes from a brigand who was active in the region around Metsovo. He used to throw his loot into a stream that led from Metsovo, and let the current carry them to the lake near Mertsi, where his aide gathered them, thus avoiding any checks by the Gendarmerie. One day however a villager saw his aide returning laden from the lake, and notified the gendarmes. They then seized the brigand, cut off his head and threw it into the stream, whereupon his aide found it in the lake.

Since 1999, the village has been a municipal department of the Municipality of Faloreia, also being its seat until November 2010. After the prefectural elections of November 2010 the village has become a part of the Municipality of the town of Trikala.

== Economy ==
The Kefalovryso residents are mainly occupied in the field of agriculture, particularly in the production of corn, wheat and cotton. Many of them are also working in the nearby city of Trikala in a variety of private enterprises or as civil servants. A few are also working in the iron and timber factories of Kefalovryso.

== Sports ==
Kefalovryso is the home of amateur football club A.O. Kefalovrysou, currently participating in the 3rd division of Trikala Amateur Football Championships. The club was founded in 1974 and its major achievement is the participation in the 1st division. In the past few years a basketball club named A.S.K. Faloreia was also founded in Kefalovryso and is currently participating in the Trikala Amateur Basketball Divisions.

== Notable people ==
- Evangelos Averoff, Politician, born in Kefalovryso in 1910
- Jorgo Papavassiliou, Film director in Germany, origin from Kefalovryso
