= Evangelismos, Elassona =

Evangelismos Ευαγγελισμός
- Community
- Location within Greece
- Coordinates: 39°50.4′N 22°6.2′E
- Country: Greece
- Administrative region: Thessaly
- Regional unit: Larissa
- Municipality: Elassona
- Municipal unit: Elassona

Area
  - Community: 23.634 km^{2} (9.125 sq mi)
- Elevation: 210 m (690 ft)

Population (2021)
  - Community: 539
  - Density: 22.8/km^{2} (59.1/sq mi)
- Time zone: UTC+2 (EET)
  - Summer (DST): UTC+3 (EEST)
- Postal code: 402 00
- Area code: +30-2493
- Vehicle registration: PI

Evangelismos (Greek: Ευαγγελισμός, pronounced [evaɲɟelizˈmos]) is a village and a community of the Elassona municipality. Before the 2011 local government reform it was part of the municipality of Elassona, of which it was a municipal district. The community of Evangelismos covers an area of 23.634 km^{2}.

== Population ==
Historical population
Year	Pop.	±%
2001	833	—
2011	722	−13.3%
2021	539	−25.3%

== See also ==
- List of settlements in the Larissa regional unit
