= Galanovrysi =

Galanovrysi Γαλανόβρυση
- Community
- Location within Greece
- Coordinates: 39°50.8′N 22°10.4′E
- Country: Greece
- Administrative region: Thessaly
- Regional unit: Larissa
- Municipality: Elassona
- Municipal unit: Elassona

Area
  - Community: 13.831 km^{2} (5.340 sq mi)
- Elevation: 280 m (920 ft)

Population (2021)
  - Community: 358
  - Density: 25.9/km^{2} (67.0/sq mi)
- Time zone: UTC+2 (EET)
  - Summer (DST): UTC+3 (EEST)
- Postal code: 402 00
- Area code: +30-2493
- Vehicle registration: PI

Galanovrysi (Greek: Γαλανόβρυση, Greek pronunciation: [ɣala'novɾisi]) is a village and a community of the Elassona municipality. Before 1927 the village was known as Aradosivia Orta(Greek: Αραδοσίβια Ορτά). Until the exchange of populations in 1924 and the arrival of the refugees from Pontus, the village was inhabited by local Greeks and local Muslims. Before the 2011 local government reform it was part of the municipality of Elassona, of which it was a municipal district. The community of Galanovrysi covers an area of 13.831 km^{2}.

== Population ==
Historical population
Year	Pop.	±%
2001	513	—
2011	428	−16.6%
2021	358	−16.4%

== See also ==
- List of settlements in the Larissa regional unit
