= Faloreia =

Faloreia Φαλωρεία
- Municipal unit
- Location within the regional unit

- Location within Greece
- Coordinates: 39°35′N 21°41′E
- Country: Greece
- Administrative region: Thessaly
- Regional unit: Trikala
- Municipality: Trikala

Area
  - Municipal unit: 76.3 km^{2} (29.5 sq mi)

Population (2021)
  - Municipal unit: 3,376
  - Municipal unit density: 44.2/km^{2} (115/sq mi)
- Time zone: UTC+2 (EET)
  - Summer (DST): UTC+3 (EEST)
- Vehicle registration: ΤΚ

Faloreia (Greek: Φαλωρεία) is a former municipality in the Trikala regional unit, Thessaly, Greece, named after the ancient city of Phaloria. Since the 2011 local government reform it is part of the municipality Trikala, of which it is a municipal unit. The municipal unit has an area of 76.329 km^{2}. Its population was 3,376 in 2021. The seat of the municipality was in Kefalovryso.
