= Kefalovryso, Larissa =

Kefalovryso Κεφαλόβρυσο
- Community
- Location within Greece
- Coordinates: 39°53.4′N 22°4.4′E
- Country: Greece
- Administrative region: Thessaly
- Regional unit: Larissa
- Municipality: Elassona
- Municipal unit: Elassona

Area
  - Community: 17.182 km^{2} (6.634 sq mi)
- Elevation: 250 m (820 ft)

Population (2021)
  - Community: 194
  - Density: 11.3/km^{2} (29.2/sq mi)
- Time zone: UTC+2 (EET)
  - Summer (DST): UTC+3 (EEST)
- Postal code: 402 00
- Area code: +30-2493
- Vehicle registration: PI

Kefalovryso (Greek: Κεφαλόβρυσο, Greek pronunciation: [kefa'lovriso]) is a village and a community of the Elassona municipality. Before the 2011 local government reform it was part of the municipality of Elassona, of which it was a municipal district. The community of Kefalovryso covers an area of 17.182 km^{2}.

== Population ==
Historical population
Year	Pop.	±%
2001	330	—
2011	234	−29.1%
2021	194	−17.1%

== See also ==
- List of settlements in the Larissa regional unit
