= Palaiokastro, Larissa =

Village in Greece

Palaiokastro Παλαιόκαστρο
- Community
- Location within Greece
- Coordinates: 39°51′N 22°4′E
- Country: Greece
- Administrative region: Thessaly
- Regional unit: Larissa
- Municipality: Elassona
- Municipal unit: Elassona

Area
  - Community: 17.532 km^{2} (6.769 sq mi)
- Elevation: 210 m (690 ft)

Population (2021)
  - Community: 218
  - Density: 12.4/km^{2} (32.2/sq mi)
- Time zone: UTC+2 (EET)
  - Summer (DST): UTC+3 (EEST)
- Postal code: 402 00
- Area code: +30-2493
- Vehicle registration: PI

Palaiokastro (Greek: Παλαιόκαστρο, Greek pronunciation: [pale'okastɾo]) is a village and a community of the Elassona municipality. Before the 2011 local government reform it was part of the municipality of Elassona, of which it was a municipal district. The community of Palaiokastro covers an area of 17.532 km^{2}.

== Population ==
Historical population
Year	Pop.	±%
2001	346	—
2011	270	−22.0%
2021	218	−19.3%

== See also ==
- List of settlements in the Larissa regional unit
