= Sarantaporo =

Sarantaporo Σαραντάπορο
- Municipal unit
- Location within the regional unit

- Location within Greece
- Coordinates: 40°04′N 22°03′E
- Country: Greece
- Administrative region: Thessaly
- Regional unit: Larissa
- Municipality: Elassona

Area
  - Municipal unit: 150.902 km^{2} (58.264 sq mi)
  - Community: 26.958 km^{2} (10.409 sq mi)
- Elevation: 840 m (2,760 ft)

Population (2021)
  - Municipal unit: 1,866
  - Municipal unit density: 12.37/km^{2} (32.03/sq mi)
  - Community: 463
  - Community density: 17.2/km^{2} (44.5/sq mi)
- Time zone: UTC+2 (EET)
  - Summer (DST): UTC+3 (EEST)
- Postal code: 402 00
- Vehicle registration: ΡΙ

Sarantaporo (Greek: Σαραντάπορο) is a village and a former municipality in the Larissa regional unit, Thessaly, Greece. Since the 2011 local government reform it is part of the municipality Elassona, of which it is a municipal unit. The municipal unit has an area of 150.902 km^{2}, and the community has an area of 26.958 km^{2}. The town is between the mountains of Kamvounia to the northwest and the Pierian Mountains to the northeast. The river Sarantaporos flows through the municipality. Sarantaporo is on the Greek National Road 3 (Larissa - Kozani - Niki). It is located west-southwest of Katerini, northwest of Elassona and Larissa, east of Grevena and south-southeast of Kozani.

== Subdivisions ==
The municipal unit Sarantaporo is subdivided into the following communities (constituent villages in brackets):

- Azoros (Vouvala)
- Gerania
- Giannota
- Lykoudi (Lykoudi, Sykia)
- Milea
- Sarantaporo
- Tsapournia (Tsapournia, Farmaki)

== Population ==
Year	Town population	Municipality population
1981	817	-
1991	938	-
2001	839	3,337
2011	580	2,455
2021	463	1,866

== History ==
The village was originally a Slavic settlement founded under the name Glikovo. Unlike the rest of Thessaly, Sarantaporo did not join Greece until October 1912 when the town was liberated from the Ottoman Empire after the Battle of Sarantaporo, a Greek victory in the First Balkan War. The Sarantaporo Gorge was the strategic location for the battle. Sarantaporo became a municipality in 1994; one of the first to be created under the Capodistrian Law. The area features archaeological findings dating back to the pre-Classical years up to the Ottoman rule.
