= Elassona =

Town in Thessaly, Greece

Elassona Ελασσόνα
- Municipality
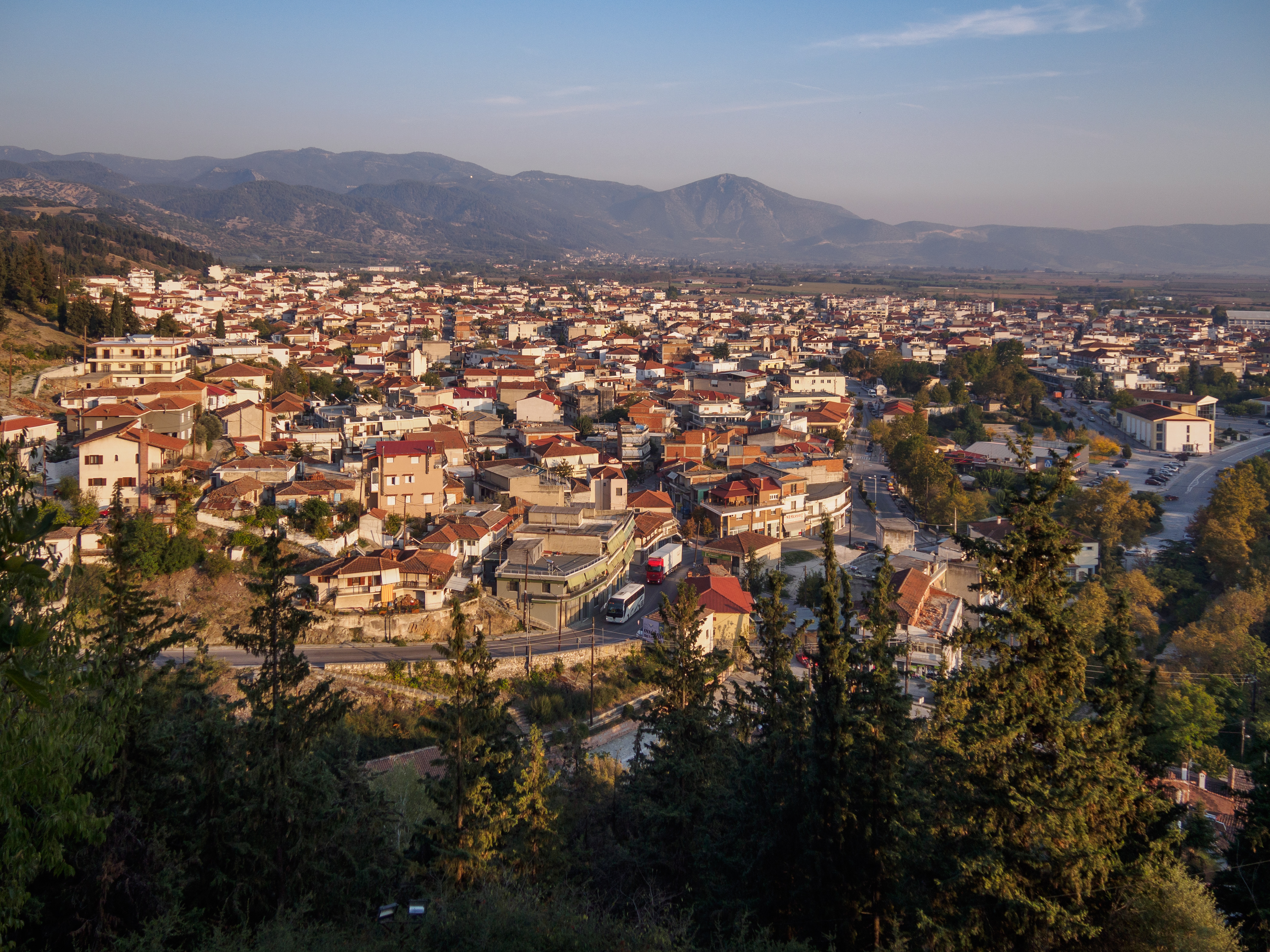
- View of Elassona

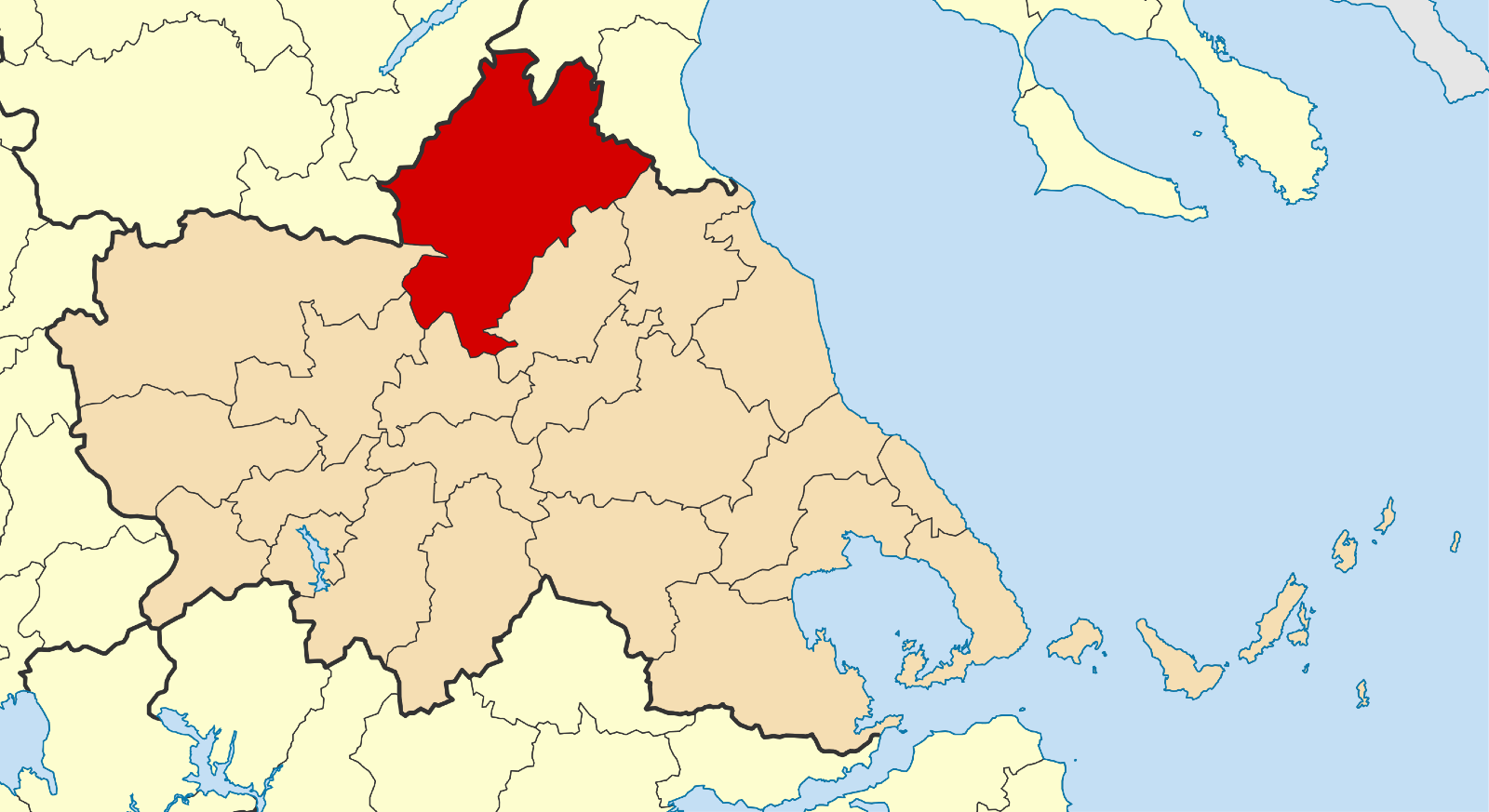

- Location within Greece
- Coordinates: 39°53′N 22°11′E
- Country: Greece
- Administrative region: Thessaly
- Regional unit: Larissa

Area
  - Municipality: 1,565.2 km^{2} (604.3 sq mi)
  - Municipal unit: 291.1 km^{2} (112.4 sq mi)
  - Community: 102.5 km^{2} (39.6 sq mi)
- Elevation: 308 m (1,010 ft)

Population (2021)
  - Municipality: 25,459
  - Density: 16.266/km^{2} (42.128/sq mi)
  - Municipal unit: 10,183
  - Municipal unit density: 34.98/km^{2} (90.60/sq mi)
  - Community: 7,476
  - Community density: 72.94/km^{2} (188.9/sq mi)
- Time zone: UTC+2 (EET)
  - Summer (DST): UTC+3 (EEST)
- Postal code: 402 00
- Area code: 2410
- Vehicle registration: ΡΙ
- Website: dimoselassonas.gr

Elassona (Greek: Ελασσόνα, romanized: Ellassóna; Katharevousa: Ἐλασσών, romanized: Elasson) is a town and a municipality in the Larissa regional unit of Greece. In antiquity, it was known as Oloosson (Ὀλοοσσών) and was a town of the Perrhaebi tribe. It is situated at the foot of Mount Olympus.

== History ==
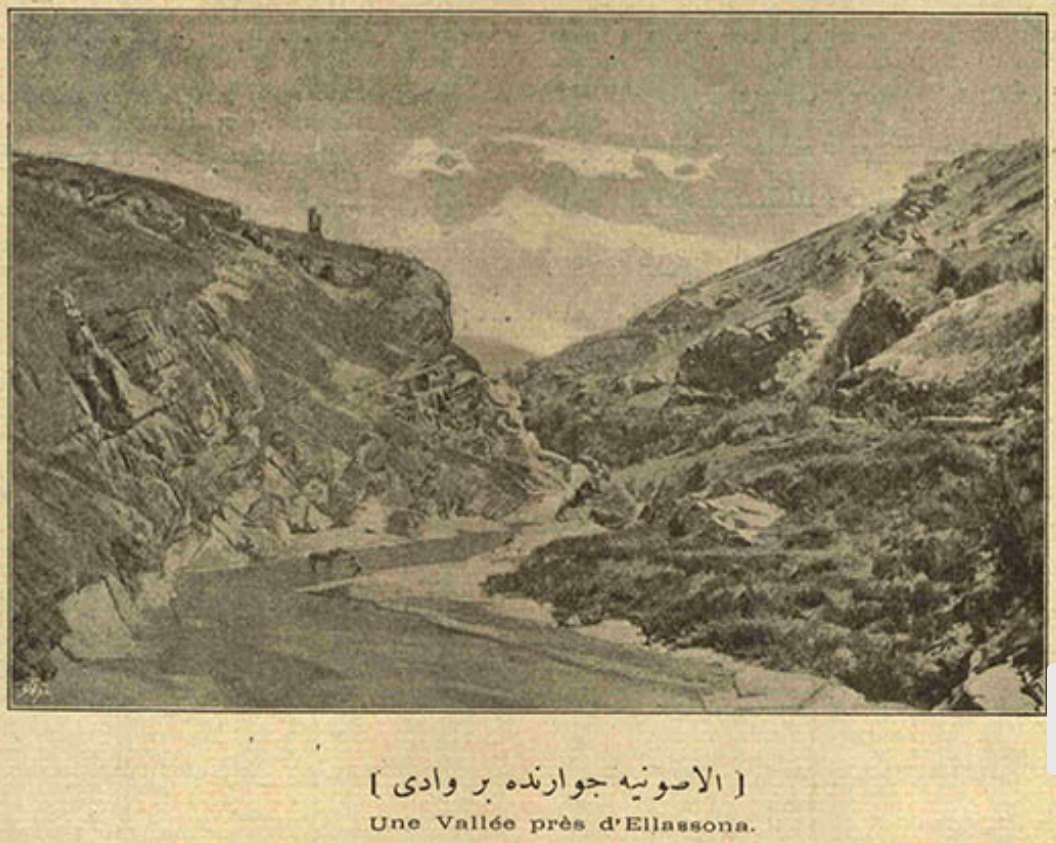
An early photograph in Servet-i Fünûn journal with French & Ottoman Turkish captions from Elassona during the Ottoman Era: "A Valley near Elassona"

Due to its location on the passes leading from the Thessalian plain to Macedonia, the site of Elassona was always of some strategic importance.

=== Antiquity and Middle Ages ===
Elassona was known as Oloosson (Ὀλοοσσών) in antiquity. In the Iliad it was mentioned in Homer's Catalogue of Ships, providing armed contingents that supported the Greek side in the Trojan War.

In the early Byzantine period it was known as Lossonos, and was one of the sites refortified under Justinian I (r. 527–565). the modern name first appears in the writings of the 12th-century scholar and archbishop Eustathius of Thessalonica, who considered it "barbaric". At the turn of the 14th century, the Panagia Olympiotissa Monastery was founded on the hilltop citadel. In 1304, Guy II de la Roche, Duke of Athens, passed through during a campaign against the Despotate of Epirus.

Following the death of Stephen Gabrielopoulos in 1333, Elassona was one of the Thessalian towns (along with Stagoi, Trikala, Damasis, and Fanari) that for a short while fell under the rule of the Epirote ruler John II Orsini (r. 1323–1335). Under Andronikos III Palaiologos (r. 1328–1341), privileges were granted to the Olympiotissa monastery, and the town became the seat of an archbishopric, a status it retained into the Ottoman period.

=== Ottoman Era ===
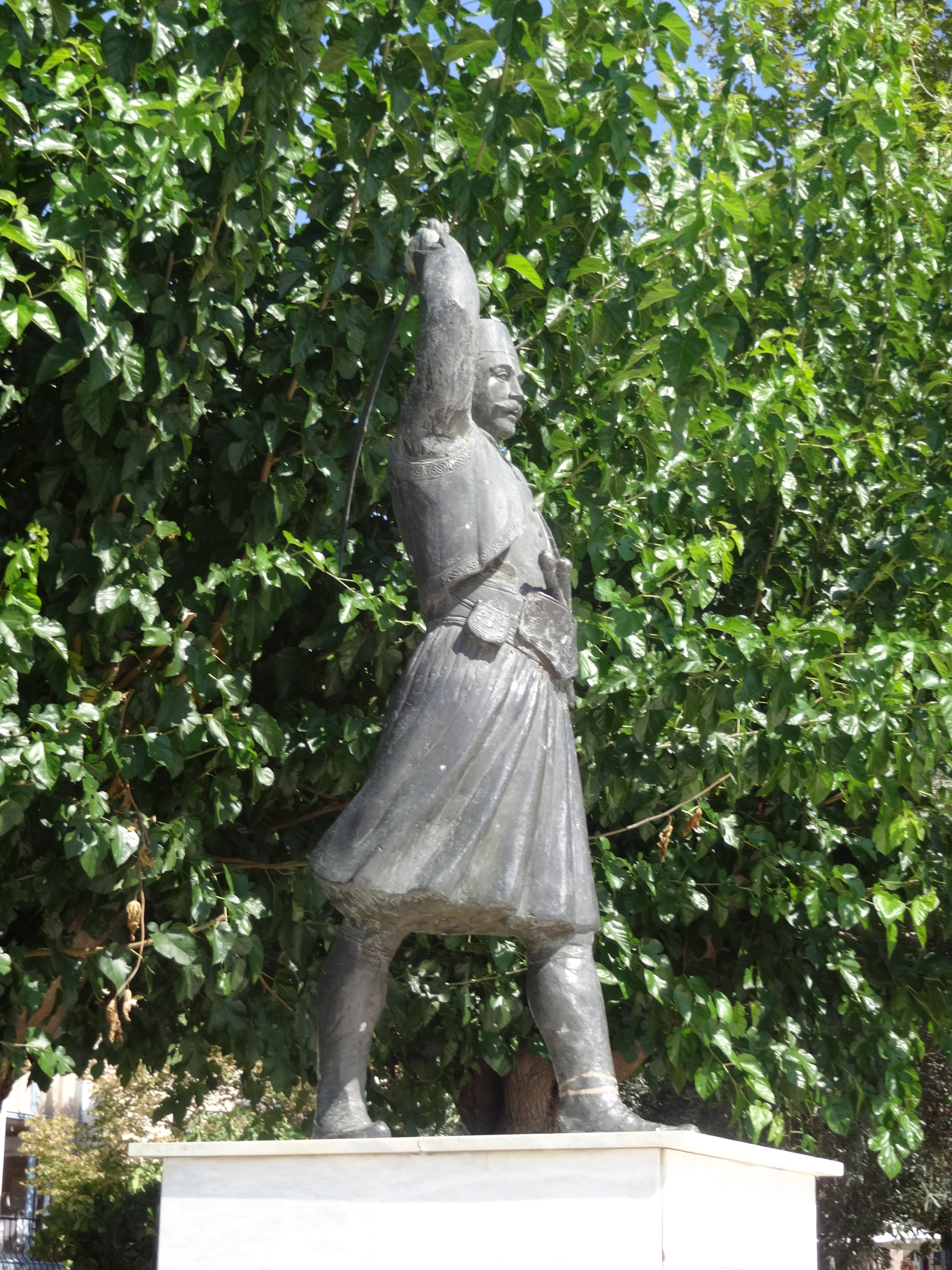
Monument of the Greek revolutionary fighter Nikotsaras

The Ottoman tax registry of 1521 counted 311 Christian and 35 Muslim households in Elassona. In the Ottoman tahrir defter of 1544, the town included Selanik Yörüks, who had military obligations that required them to give five soldiers (eşküncü) and 20 assistants (yamaks) per household (ocak). During the Ottoman period devshirme was practiced in the area and janissaries were recruited from Elassona (Alasonya in Ottoman Turkish) as shown in an Ottoman register of 1603–1604. Some Christians of Elassona also rebelled in 1821 under the armatole captain of Elassona. However, in less than a year they asked for amnesty under the same captain and stated that the reaya of some other localities are about to follow suit and were granted amnesty. The Ottomans declared in February 1822 that if the rebellious reaya beg for pardon, their appeal were to be accepted, so long as they meet the specified conditions.

In the 1881–1893 census of the Ottoman Empire, the kaza of Elassona had a total population of 26,855; consisting of 24,631 Greek Orthodox, 2,188 Muslims, 15 Jews, one Armenian, and 20 foreign citizens. Unlike the rest of Thessaly, which was annexed by Greece in 1881, Elassona remained part of the Ottoman Empire until 1912, when it joined Greece (along with Crete, Macedonia and Epirus) following its victory in the Balkan Wars.

== Municipality ==
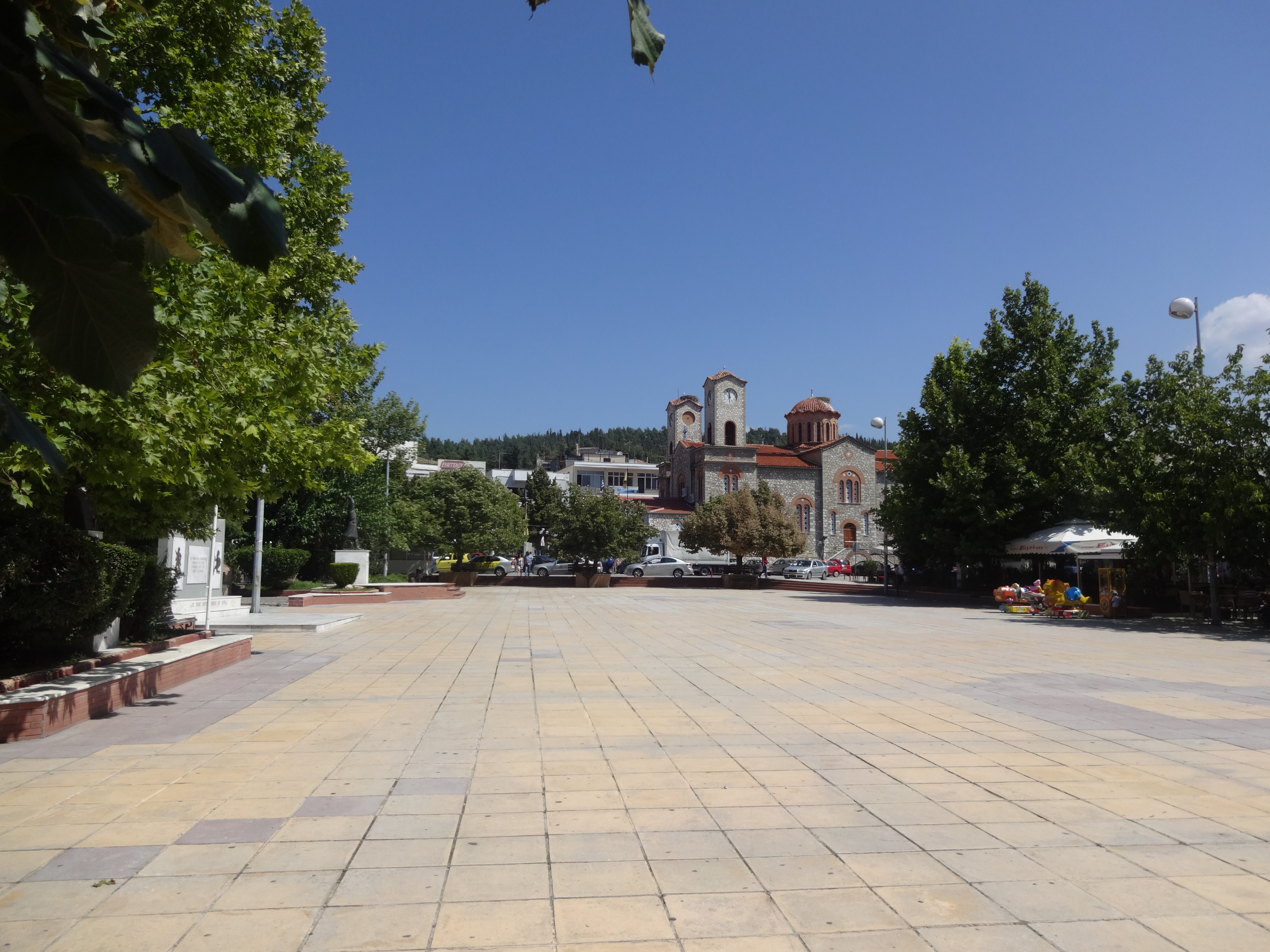
Central square

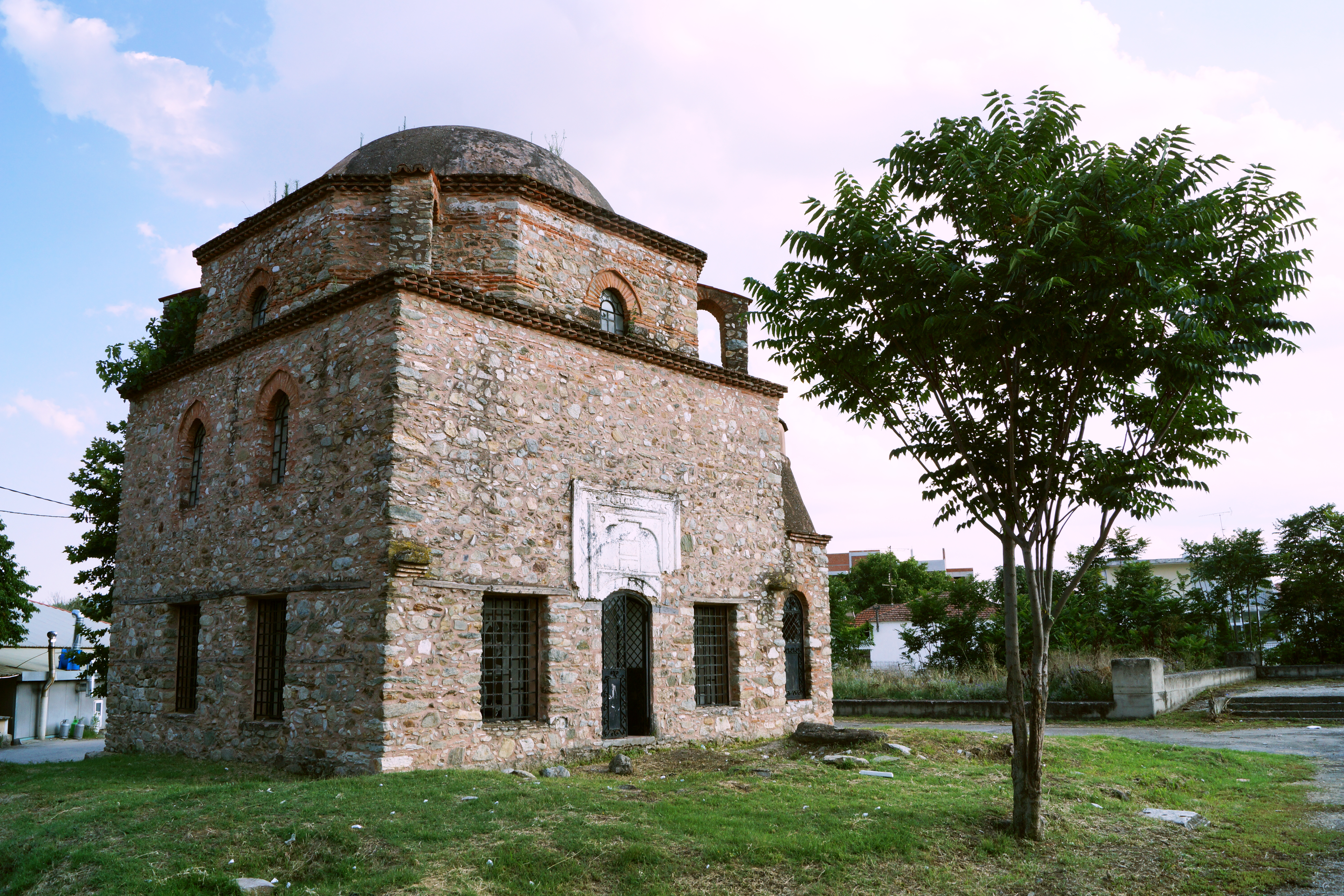
Remnants of Muharrem Paşa Mosque

The municipality Elassona was formed at the 2011 local government reform by the merger of the following 9 former municipalities, that became municipal units:

- Antichasia
- Elassona
- Karya
- Livadi
- Olympos
- Potamia
- Sarantaporo
- Tsaritsani
- Verdikoussa

=== Subdivisions ===
The municipal unit of Elassona is divided into the following communities:

- Elassona (Elassona, Agioneri, Aetorrachi, Mikro Eleftherochori)
- Drymos
- Evangelismos
- Galanovrysi
- Kefalovryso
- Palaiokastro
- Stefanovouno (Stefanovouno, Lefki)
- Valanida (Valanida, Kleisoura)

=== Municipal changes ===
Until March 15, 2006, Tsaritsani was part of the municipality (now municipal unit) of Elassona and functioned as a municipal district. Under the law 3448/15-3-2006, Tsaritsani got separated from the municipality and declared a commune. The loss of its population and land leaves the remaining municipality with an adjusted 2001 census population of 12,056 and a land area of 291.097 km².

== Province ==
The province of Elassona (Greek: Επαρχία Ελασσόνας) was one of the provinces of the Larissa Prefecture. It had the same territory as the present municipality. It was abolished in 2006.

== Population ==
Year	Town	Community	Municipal unit	Municipality
1981	7,146	-	-	-
1991	7,225	-	15,637	-
2001	7,233	7,762	14,563	-
2011	7,338	7,750	11,044	32,121
2021	-	7,476	10,183	25,459

== Geography ==
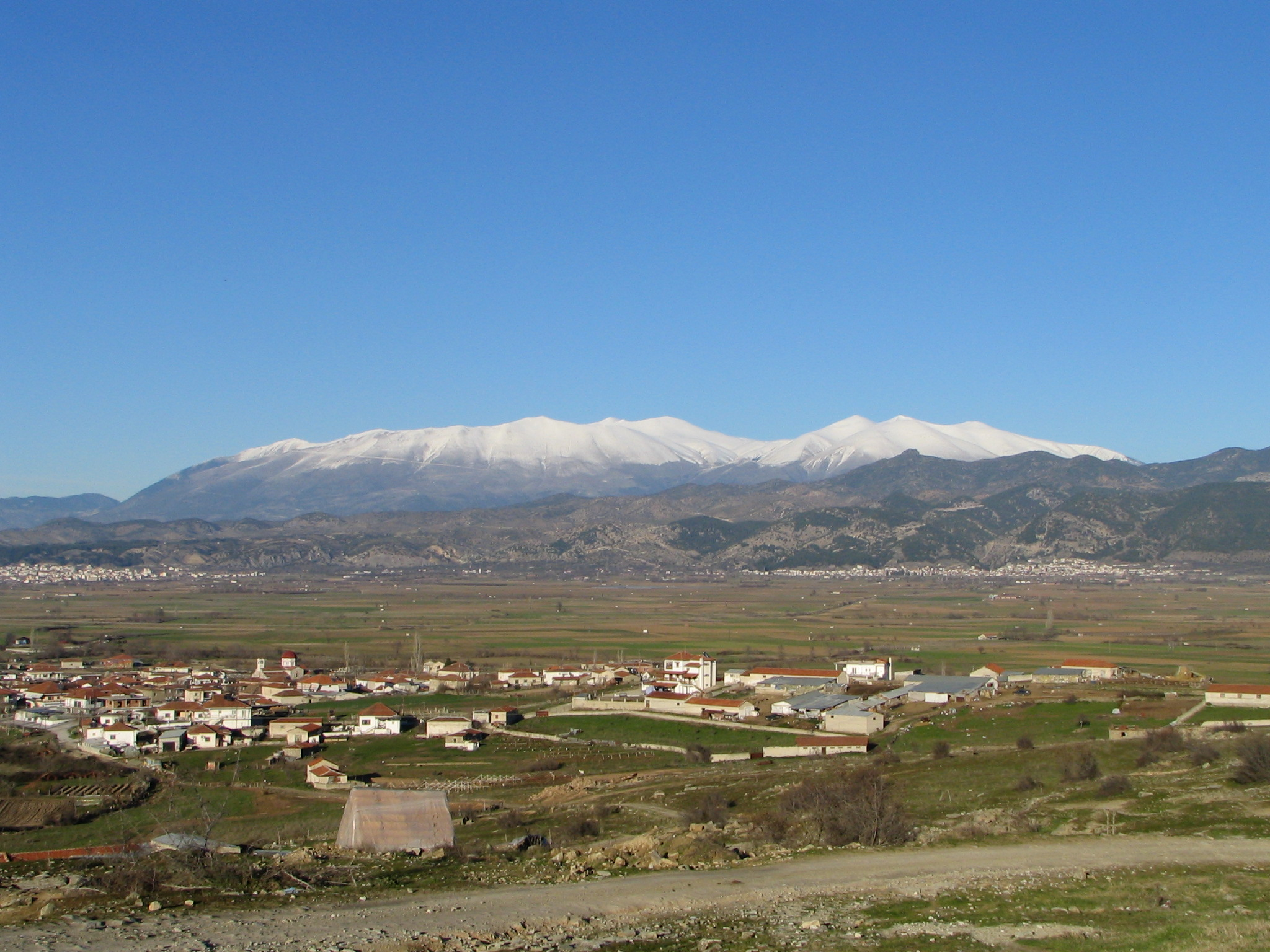
View of Olympus from Elassona

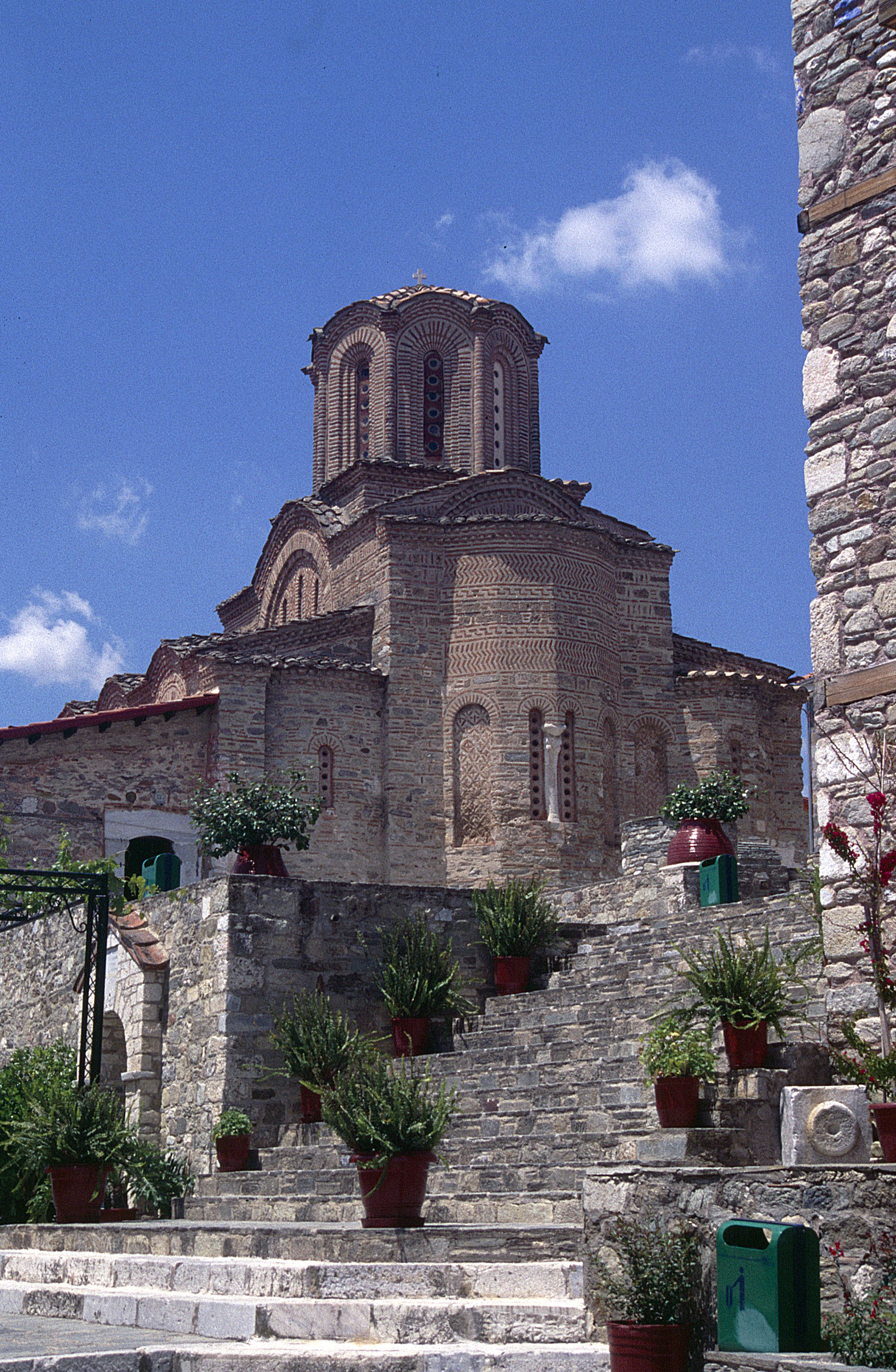
The katholikon of Panagia Olympiotissa Monastery

The municipality Elassona has an area of 1565.2 km^{2}, the municipal unit Elassona has an area of 291.097 km^{2} (excluding Tsaritsani), and the community Elassona has an area of 102.515 km^{2}.

Its geography includes farmlands in the valley areas, the mountains to the west and east and forests in the west and east as well as grasslands, ledges are to be founded in some areas and barren area in the higher elevations.

The rivers Elassonitis (or Elassonitikos) and Titarisio flow through Elassona and they both flow into the Pineios River, Thessaly's longest river. The river divides the town into two parts, the older city built on the Olympiotissa hill and is also Varosi or Varossi (Βαρόσι), and the new city on the right bank of the river. These two parts of the city are connected by four bridges, one of which is an ancient stone arch bridge. The other part is near the Kefalovrysi Lake.

Melissotrypa Cave near Kefalovryso is one of just a handful of caves identified worldwide whose ecosystems support life based on chemosynthesis, rather than photosynthesis.

== Transportation ==
The EO3 and EO26 national roads are the main roads through the town: the EO3 used to run via Mesochori towards Tyrnavos and Larissa, before it took on a more direct route. The EO13 is also within the municipality.

Elassona is located 70 km southwest of Katerini, 38 km NNW of Larissa (old: about 50 km), 22 km NW of Tyrnavos (old: 30 km), east of Deskati and Grevena and 78 km ESE of Kozani.

== Sports ==
In Elassona is based the local football team P.O. Elassona F.C., which plays a leading role in Larissa football as well as in the national divisions, currently competing in the Gamma Ethniki.

== Landmarks and monuments ==
- Arched bridge of Elassona
- Elassona Mosque
- Ottoman customs house of Elassona
- Panagia Olympiotissa Monastery
- Agia Triada Monastery, Sparmos
